= Miche criterion =

Wave breaking steepness limit

In fluid dynamics and coastal engineering, the Miche criterion, Miche formula or Miche breaking index is a theoretical upper bound on the steepness of a non-breaking, periodic wave in finite water depth. It gives the maximum wave height that can persist at a given depth and wavelength. Waves that exceed this bound are unstable and must break. The criterion was derived by French engineer Robert Miche in 1944 at the École nationale des ponts et chaussées in a study of wave motion over constant and decreasing depth.

== Formulation ==
Miche's work provides an upper limit for wave breaking, with observations in deep sea locations indicating that breaking criteria can be independent of steepness. Miche shows that, theoretically, the maximum height of a fixed-form, periodic wave is controlled by the fact that the particle velocity at the wave crest $u_x$ cannot be larger than the celerity of the wave, $c$, resulting in the following:

$H_{\max} \approx 0.14L\tanh\left(\frac{2\pi D}{L}\right)$

In deep water, this makes the steepness of an individual wave s_{max} = H_{max}/L ≈ 0.14. In his 1944 paper, Miche expressed the limiting steepness in two equivalent forms:

Steepness form:

$\frac{H_b}{L} \;\le\; 0.142\,\tanh\!\left(\frac{2\pi h_b}{L}\right)$

Wavenumber form:

$k\,H_b \;\le\; 0.88\,\tanh(kh_b), \quad k=\frac{2\pi}{L}$

where $H_b$ is the wave height at incipient breaking, $L$ the wavelength, $h_b$ the local water depth, and $k$ is the wavenumber.

== Limits ==
Two limits follow directly from the criterion:

- Deep water ($kh \gg 1$): $H/L \le 0.142$.
- Shallow water ($kh \ll 1$): $H/h \le 0.88$ (often called the breaker index).

== Interpretation and use ==
Miche's result gives a necessary condition for non-breaking waves, and an upper theoretical limit for wave breaking. If the inequality is violated at a point, a steady periodic wave cannot exist and breaking must occur. In practice the criterion is used to:

- check numerical or physical model results for wave heights in shallow areas;
- estimate an upper bound for local wave run-up and loads on coastal structures when explicit breaking dissipation is not modelled;
- define a cap for random-sea parameters by applying the bound to a representative height such as significant wave height $H_s$ (or the wave energy parameter $H_{m0}$) as a conservative proxy.

For random waves on natural slopes, empirical breaker indices used in design are often somewhat lower than the shallow water upper bound of 0.88, however Miche's relation provides a theoretical ceiling.

== History ==
Miche developed the criterion while studying the limiting form of wave crests at the point of breaking, including effects of finite depth and possible rotational components. His work focused on periodic waves in constant depth, wave transformation over regularly decreasing depth, and the geometry and kinematics of limiting (breaking) waves near the shore. The first part of Miche's 1944 paper focused on application of breaking wave limits to coastal engineering structures such as breakwaters, as well as patterns of standing waves.

== Subsequent developments ==
Following Miche's original work, numerous studies have extended or reinterpreted the breaking limit. While Miche's relation remains a theoretical upper bound for periodic non-breaking waves, more general breaking onset criteria have been proposed to capture the dynamics of transient and irregular waves. One model employs kinematic criteria based on the ratio of the horizontal particle velocity at the wave crest to the phase speed, with breaking expected when this ratio approaches unity. Subsequent simulations have refined this approach, allowing a more universal definition of the breaking threshold.

Work by Battjes and Janssen (1978) used Miche's work as a reference, and introduced an adjustable breaker parameter (γ) to better match random, shallow water breaking on sloping beaches. Recent laboratory and numerical studies have also linked Miche's theoretical limit to the behaviour of rogue waves. Experiments reproducing the Draupner wave - a 25.6m rogue wave measured in the North Sea - have shown that breaking onset and crest steepness depend strongly on directional wave crossing, with large crossing angles permitting steeper, non-breaking crests than predicted by the one-dimensional Miche limit. Laboratory and field investigations have similarly observed that abrupt depth transitions and directional spreading can promote locally increased wave steepness and rogue wave occurrence beyond classical breaking limits.

== See also ==
- Breaking wave
- Wave shoaling
- Iribarren number
