= Wave overtopping =

Transmission of water waves over a coastal structure

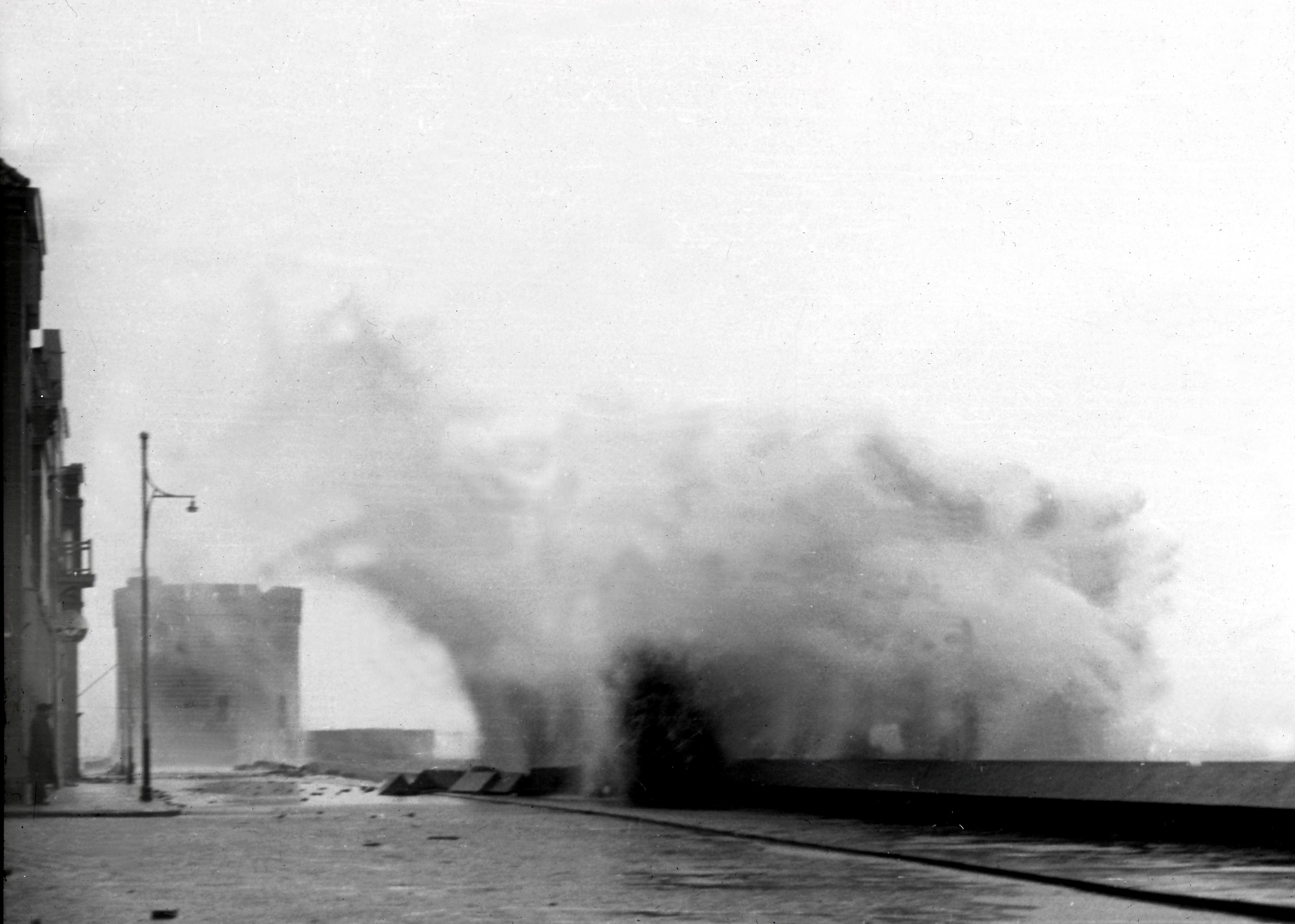
Wave overtopping in Vlissingen during a storm, 1953 or 1954

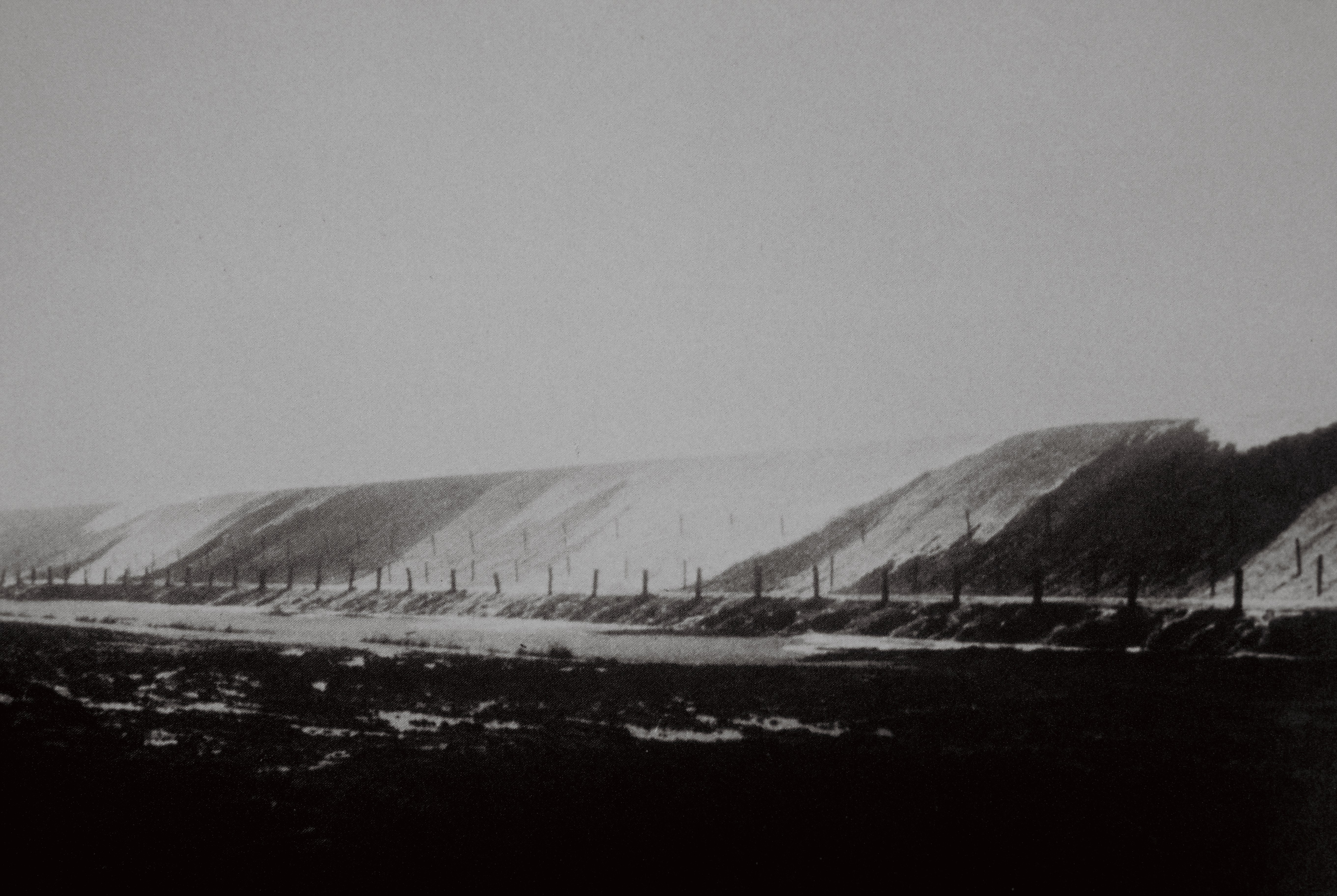
Overtopping on the inner slope of a dike in Northern Germany during a storm, 1954

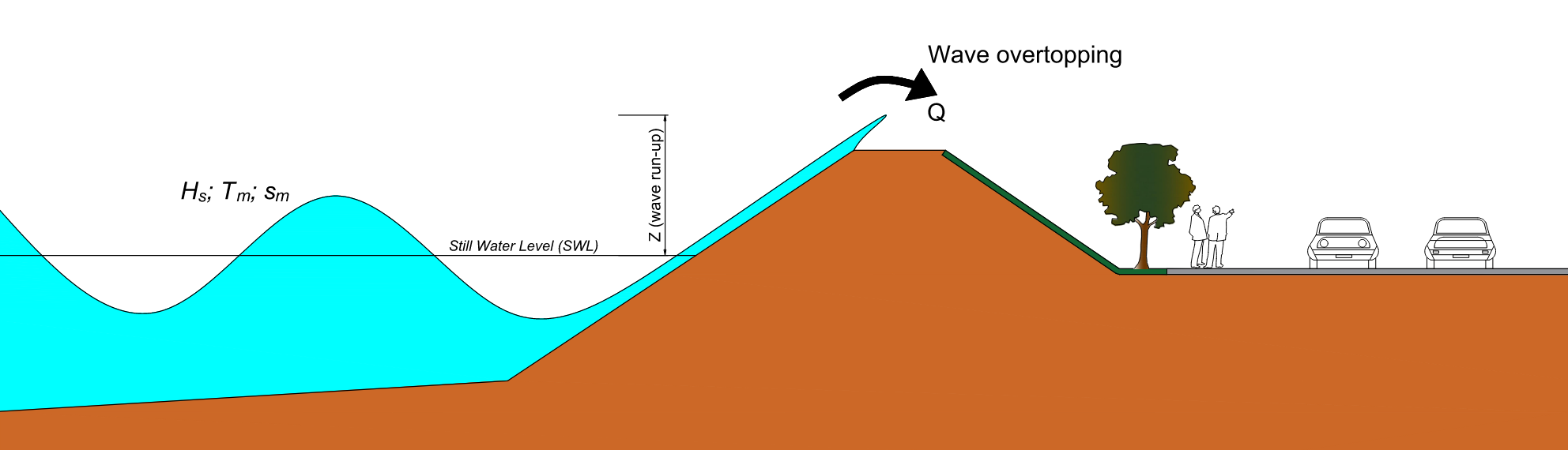
Wave overtopping and wave run-up at a coastal structure

Wave overtopping is the time-averaged amount of water that is discharged (in liters per second) per structure length (in meters) by waves over a structure such as a breakwater, revetment or dike which has a crest height above still water level.

When waves break over a dike, it causes water to flow onto the land behind it. Excessive overtopping is undesirable because it can compromise the integrity of the structure or result in a safety hazard, particularly when the structure is in an area where people, infrastructure or vehicles are present, such as in the case of a dike fronting an esplanade or densely populated area.

Wave overtopping typically transpires during extreme weather events, such as intense storms, which often elevate water levels beyond average due to wind setup. These effects may be further intensified when the storm coincides with a high spring tide.

Excessive overtopping may cause damage to the inner slope of the dike, potentially leading to failure and inundation of the land behind the dike, or create water-related issues on the inside of the dike due to excess water pressure and inadequate drainage. The process is highly stochastic, and the amount of overtopping depends on factors including the freeboard, wave height, wave period, the geometry of the structure, and slope of the dike.

== Overtopping factors and influences ==
Overtopping can transpire through various combinations of water levels and wave heights, wherein a low water level accompanied by high waves may yield an equivalent overtopping outcome to that of a higher water level with lower waves. This phenomenon is inconsequential when water levels and wave heights exhibit correlation; however, it poses difficulties in river systems where these factors are uncorrelated. In such instances, a probabilistic calculation is necessary.

The freeboard is the height of the dike's crest above the still water level, which usually corresponds to the determining storm surge level or river water level. Overtopping is typically expressed in litres per second per metre of dike length (L/s/m), as an average value. Overtopping follows the cyclical nature of waves, resulting in a large amount of water flowing over a structure, followed by a period with no water. The official website of the EurOtop Manual, which is widely used in the design of coastal engineering structures, features a number of visualisations of wave overtopping.

In the case of overtopping at rubble-mound breakwaters, recent research using numerical models indicates that overtopping is strongly dependent on the slope angle. Since present design guidelines for non-breaking waves do not include the effect of the slope angle, modified guidelines have also been proposed. Whilst these observed slope effects are too large to be ignored, they still need to be verified by tests using physical models.

Overtopping behaviour is also influenced by the geometry and layout of different coastal structures. For example, seawalls (which are typically vertical, or near-vertical, as opposed to sloping breakwaters or revetments), are often situated behind natural beaches. Scour at the base of these structures during storms can have a direct impact on wave energy dissipation along their frontage, thus influencing wave overtopping. This phenomenon assumes critical importance when storms occur in such quick succession that the beach doesn't have sufficient time for sediments removed by the storm to be re-established. Experimental results show that, for near-vertical structures at the back of a beach, there is an increase in wave overtopping volume for a storm that starts from an eroded beach configuration, rather than a simple slope.

== Calculation of overtopping ==
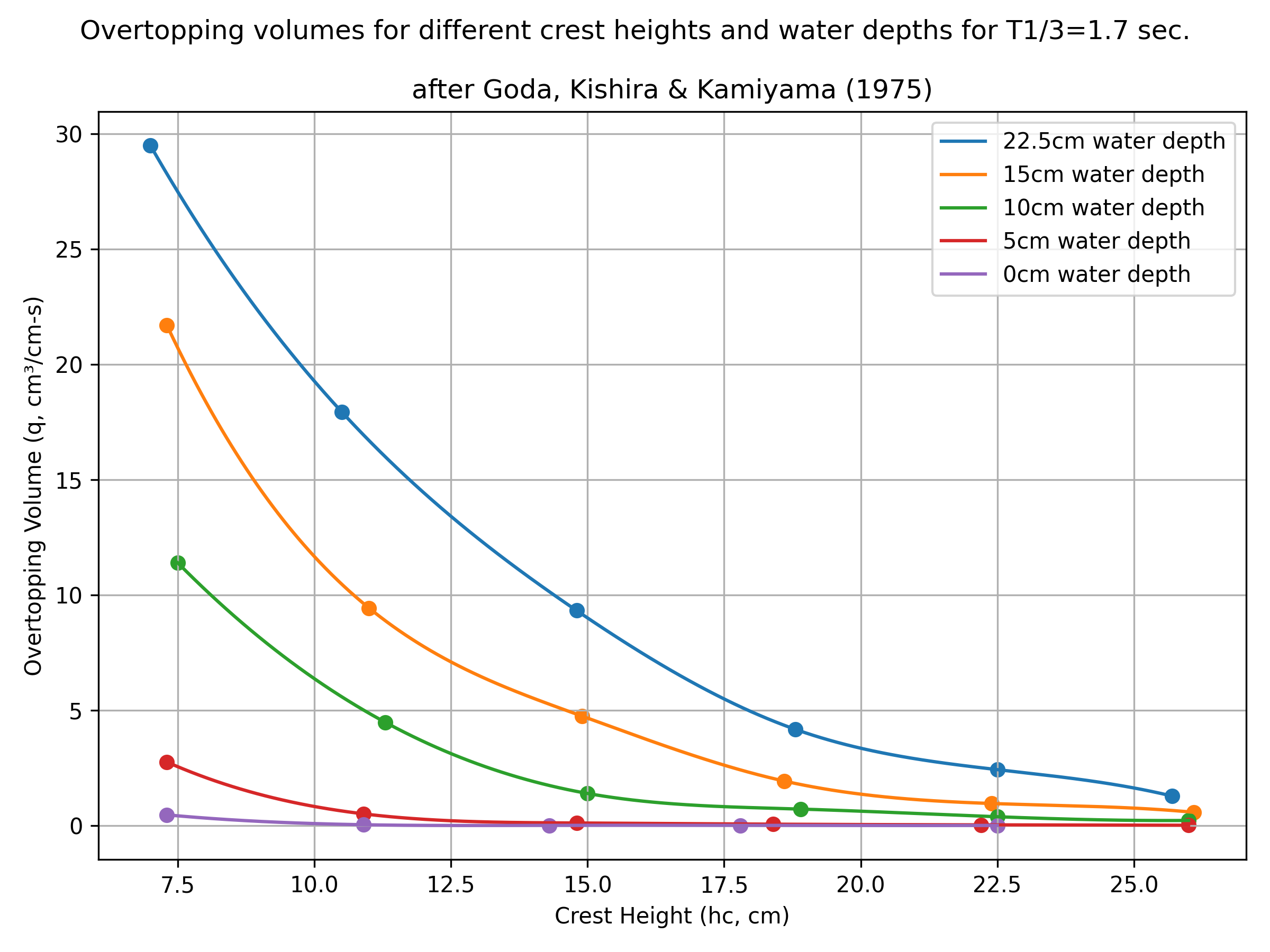
This graph shows some of the results from laboratory experiments by Goda, Kishira and Kamiyama in 1975, in which scale model (vertical) sea walls were subject to overtopping. The graph shows the overtopping volume on the y axis, the crest height of the experimental structure on the x axis, and different experimental water depths are colour coded. An increased water depth in front of the structure results in a higher volume of overtopping, whilst increasing the crest height reduces it. In these graphs, the overtopping is a function of water depth and wave period, however current practice in the EurOtop Manual is to use the wave height. Goda's findings are however equally valid, and Hendrik Lorentz found similar results during measurements for the Zuiderzee Works in the 1920s.

Wave overtopping predominantly depends on the respective heights of individual waves compared to the crest level of the coastal structure involved. This overtopping doesn't occur continuously; rather, it's a sporadic event that takes place when particularly high waves within a storm impact the structure.

The extent of wave overtopping is quantified by the volume of water that overflows onto the adjacent land. This can be measured either as the volume of water per wave for each unit length of the seawall, or as the average rate of overtopped water volume per unit length during the storm wave period.

Much research into overtopping has been carried out, ranging from laboratory experiments to full-scale testing and the use of simulators. In 1971, Jurjen Battjes developed a theoretically accurate equation for determining the average overtopping. However, the formula's complexity, involving error functions, has limited its widespread adoption in practical applications. Consequently, an alternative empirical relationship has been established:

$$Q=a \cdot \exp\left(-b \frac{R}{\gamma}\right)$$

in which $Q$ is the dimensionless overtopping, and $R$ is the dimensionless freeboard:

$Q = \frac{q}{\sqrt{gH_s^2}} \sqrt{\frac{h/L_0}{\tan \alpha}}$

$$R = \frac{h_c}{H_s} \frac{1}{\xi}$$

in which:

$h$ is the water depth
$h_c$ is the freeboard
$q$ is the overtopping discharge (in m³/s)
$H_s$ is the significant wave height at the toe of the structure
$L_0$ is the deep water wavelength
$\alpha$ is the inclination of the slope (of e.g. the breakwater or revetment)
$\xi$ is the Iribarren number
$\gamma$ is a resistance term.

The values of $a$ and $b$ depend on the type of breaking wave, as shown in the table below:

Type of wave	Value for $a$	Value for $b$
breaking (plunging)	0.067	4.3
non-breaking (surging)	0.2	2.3

Types of breaking wave

The resistance term $\gamma$ has a value between approximately 0.5 (for two layers of loosely dumped armourstone) and 1.0 (for a smooth slope). The effect of a berm and obliquely incident waves is also taken into account through the resistance term. This is determined in the same way as when calculating wave run-up. Special revetment blocks that reduce wave run-up (e.g., Hillblock, Quattroblock) also reduce wave overtopping. Since the governing overtopping is the boundary condition, this means that the use of such elements allows for a slightly lower flood barrier.

Research for the EurOtop manual has provided much additional data, and based on this, the formula has been slightly modified to:

$$\frac{q}{\sqrt{gH^3_{m0}}} = \frac{0{.}026}{\sqrt{\tan\alpha}}\gamma_b
\xi_{m-1.0}\cdot \exp\left[
-\left(2{.}5\frac{R_c}{\xi_{m-1.0} H_{m0}\gamma}\right)^{1{.}3}
\right]$$

with a maximum of:

$$\frac{q}{\sqrt{gH^3_{m0}}} = 0{.}1 \,\exp\left[-\left(1{.}35\frac{R_c}{ H_{m0}\gamma} \right)^{1{.}3} \right]$$

It turns out that this formula is also a perfect rational approximation of the original Battjes formula.

In certain applications, it may also be necessary to calculate individual overtopping quantities, i.e. the overtopping per wave. The volumes of individual overtopping waves are Weibull distributed. The overtopping volume per wave for a given probability of exceedance is given by:

$$V=a[-\ln(P_v)]^{4/3}$$
$$a=0.84T_mq/P_{ov}$$
$$P_{ov}=\exp\Bigl[-\Bigl(\surd-\ln0.02*(h_c/R_{u2%})\Bigr)^2\Bigr]$$

in which $P_v$ is the probability of exceedance of the calculated volume, $P_{ov}$ is the probability of overtopping waves, and $h_c$ is the crest height.

=== Calculation and measurement of overtopping at rock revetment crests ===
In terms of revetments, the overtopping discussed in the EurOtop manual refers to the overtopping measured at the seaward edge of the revetment crest. The formulas above describe the wave overtopping occurring at the sea-side edge of the crest. In scenarios where the crest is impermeable (for example, a road surface or a clay layer), the volume of water overtopping the inland side of the crest would roughly equal that on the seaside. However, in the case of a rock armour breakwater with a more permeable crest, a large part of the overtopping water will seep into the crest, thus providing less overtopping on the inside of it. To analyse this effect, reduction coefficient $\gamma$ can be used. This factor can be multiplied by 0.5 for a standard crest, with a width of about three rocks. This can result in a significant reduction in overtopping, and thus in the required crest height. If, behind the crest at a lower level, a permeable rock armour layer is installed with width $x$, the amount of overtopping on the landside of this layer decreases still further. In that case, the reduction term $\gamma$ (not to be confused with the reduction co-efficient $\gamma_b$) can be multiplied by $-0.142 \frac{x}{B}+0.577$, in which $B$ is the crest width.

=== Berm breakwaters ===
The circumstances surrounding overtopping at berm-type breakwaters differ slightly from those of dikes. Minor wave overtopping may occur as splashes from waves striking individual rocks. However, significant overtopping typically results in a horizontal flow across the crest, similar to what happens with dikes. The primary distinction lies in the wave heights used for designing these structures. Dikes rarely face wave heights exceeding 3 metres, while berm breakwaters are often designed to withstand wave heights of around 5 metres. This difference impacts the overtopping behaviour when dealing with smaller overtopping discharges.

== Tolerable overtopping ==
An understanding wave overtopping involves a combination of empirical data, physical modelling, and numerical simulations to predict and mitigate its impacts on coastal structures and safety. Traditionally, permissible average overtopping discharge has been utilised as a standard for designing coastal structures. It is necessary to restrict the average overtopping discharge to guarantee both the structural integrity of the structure, as well as the protection of individuals, vehicles, and properties situated behind it. Design handbooks often stipulate the thresholds for the maximum individual overtopping volumes, necessitating the examination of wave overtopping on a wave-per-wave basis. Often, to ensure a more dependable level of safety for pedestrians and vehicles, or to evaluate the stability of the inner slope of a revetment, it is necessary to consider the peak velocity and thickness of the overtopping flow.

The tolerable overtopping is the overtopping which the design accepts may occur during a design storm condition. It is dependent on a number of factors including the intended use of the dike or coastal structure, and the quality of the revetment. Tolerable overtopping volumes are site-specific and depend on various factors, including the size and usage of the receiving area, the dimensions and capacity of drainage ditches, damage versus inundation curves, and return period. For coastal defences safeguarding the lives and well-being of residents, workers, and recreational users, designers and overseeing authorities must also address the direct hazards posed by overtopping. This necessitates evaluating the level of hazard and its likelihood of occurrence, thereby enabling the development of suitable action plans to mitigate risks associated with overtopping events.

For rubble mound breakwaters (e.g., in harbour breakwaters) and a significant wave height $H_{m0}$ greater than 5m on the outside, a heavy rubble mound revetment on the inside is required for overtopping of 10-30 L/s per metre. For overtopping of 5-20 L/s per metre, there is a high risk of damage to the crest.

Situation on the slope	$q$ (L/s per metre)
Quarry stone in waves $H_{m0}$ > 5m, and some damage	1
Quarry stone in waves $H_{m0}$ > 5m, and some damage(*)	5 - 10
Good grass cover $H_{m0}$ between 1m and 3m	5
Poor grass cover $H_{m0}$ between 0.5m and 3m	0.1
Poor grass cover $H_{m0}$ < 1m	5 - 10
Poor grass cover $H_{m0}$ < 0.3 m	Unlimited
(*)and inner slope designed for overtopping

For regular grass, an average overtopping of 5 L/s per metre of dike is considered permissible. For very good grass cover, without special elements or street furniture such as stairs, sign poles, or fences, 10 L/s per metre is allowed. Overtopping tests with a wave overtopping simulator have shown that for an undamaged grass cover, without special elements, 50L/s per metre often causes no damage. The problem is not so much the strength of the grass cover, but the presence of other elements such as gates, stairs and fences. It should be considered that, for example, 5 L/s per metre can occur due to high waves and a high freeboard, or low waves with a low freeboard. In the first case, there are not many overtopping waves, but when one overtops, it creates a high flow velocity on the inner slope. In the second case, there are many overtopping waves, but they create relatively low flow velocities. As a result, the requirements for overtopping over river dikes are different from those for sea dikes.

A good sea dike with a continuous grass cover can easily handle 10 L/s per metre without problems, assuming good drainage is provided at the foot of the inner slope. Without adequate drainage, the amount of water that could potentially enter properties at the foot of the inner slope would be unacceptable, which is why such dikes are designed for a lower overtopping amount. Since it has been found that a grass cover does not fail due to the average overtopping, but rather due to the frequent occurrence of high flow velocities, coastal authorities such as Rijkswaterstaat in the Netherlands have decided (since 2015) to no longer test grass slopes on the inner side of the dike for average overtopping discharge, but rather for the frequency of high flow velocities during overtopping.

Research has shown that grass roots can contribute to improving the shear strength of soil used in dike construction, providing that the grass is properly maintained. Developing a grass cover takes time and requires a suitable substrate, such as lean and reasonably compacted clay. Firmly compacted clay soil is initially unsuitable for colonisation by grass plants. However, after a frost or winter period, the top layer of such a compacted clay layer is sufficiently open for the establishment of grass. To function properly, grass cover formation must begin well before winter.

Research in The Netherlands has found that dikes with a well-compacted and flat clay lining can withstand a limited wave height or limited wave overtopping, such as in the majority of river areas, during the first winter after construction even without a grass cover, for many days without significant damage. If the wave load in the river area is higher, no damage that threatens safety will occur if the clay lining is thick enough (0.8 metres or more) and adequately compacted throughout its entire thickness. An immature grass cover can be temporarily protected against hydraulic loads with stapled geotextile mats.

Category	$H_{m0}$(m)	$q$ L/s per metre
Pedestrians with a view of the sea	3	0.3
Pedestrians with a view of the sea	2	1
Pedestrians with a view of the sea	1	10–20
Pedestrians with a view of the sea	<0.5	Unlimited
Cars, trains	3	<5
Cars, trains	2	10–20
Cars, trains	1	<75

For damage to ships in harbours or marinas, the following figures can be used:

Category	$H_{m0}$(m)	$q$ L/s per metre
Sinking of large ships	>5	>10
Sinking of large ships	3 - 5	>20
Damage to small ships	3 - 5	>5
Safe for large ships	> 5	<5
Safe for small ships	3- 5	<1
Damage to buildings	1-3	<1
Damage to equipment and street furniture		<1

These values provide guidance on the expected impact of overtopping on ships in marinas or harbours, on nearby buildings and other infrastructure, depending on the significant wave height $H{m0}$ and overtopping rate (in L/s per metre). This information then helps inform the appropriate design, the required protection measures, and response plans for different scenarios.

== Wave transmission ==
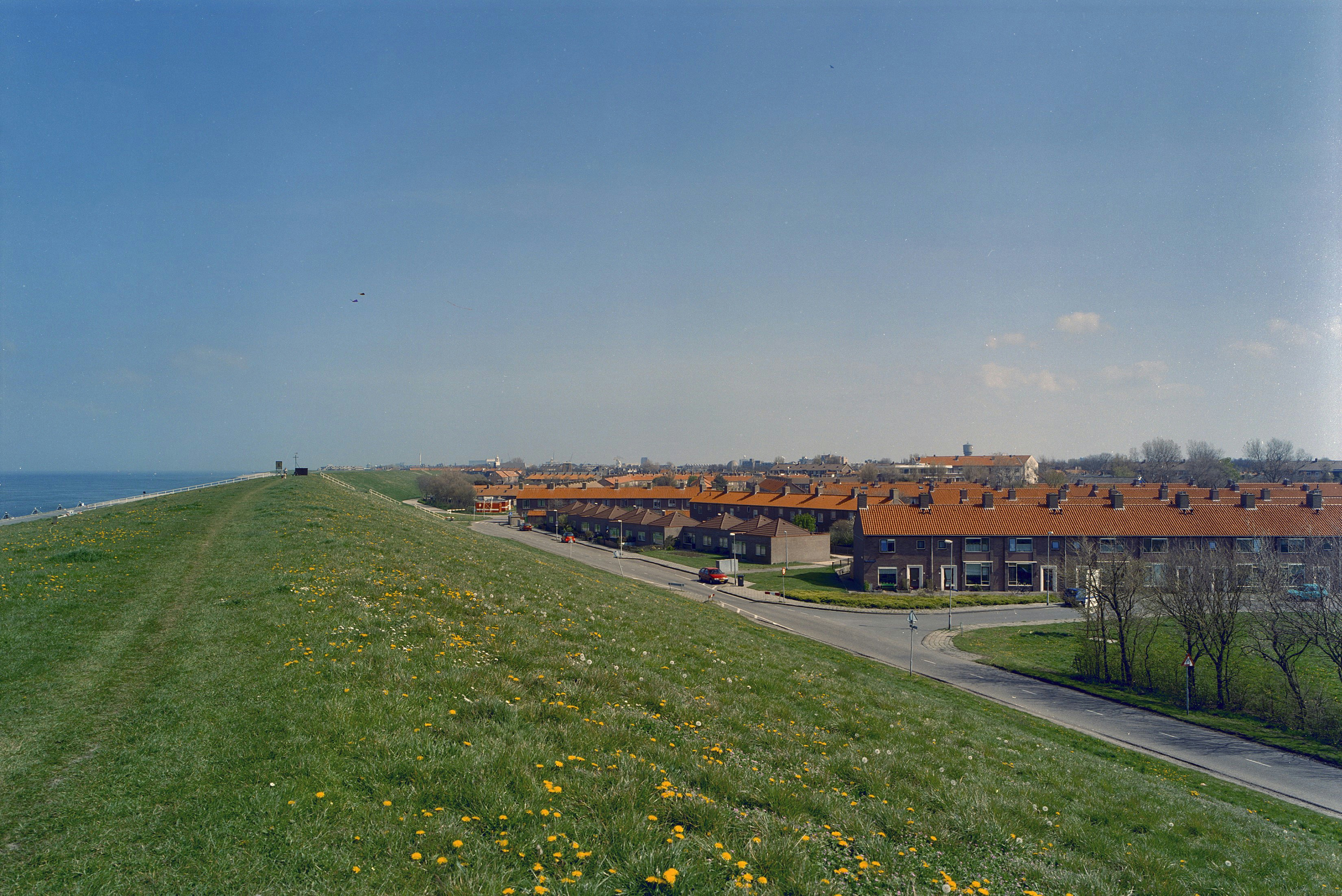
A dike at Den Helder

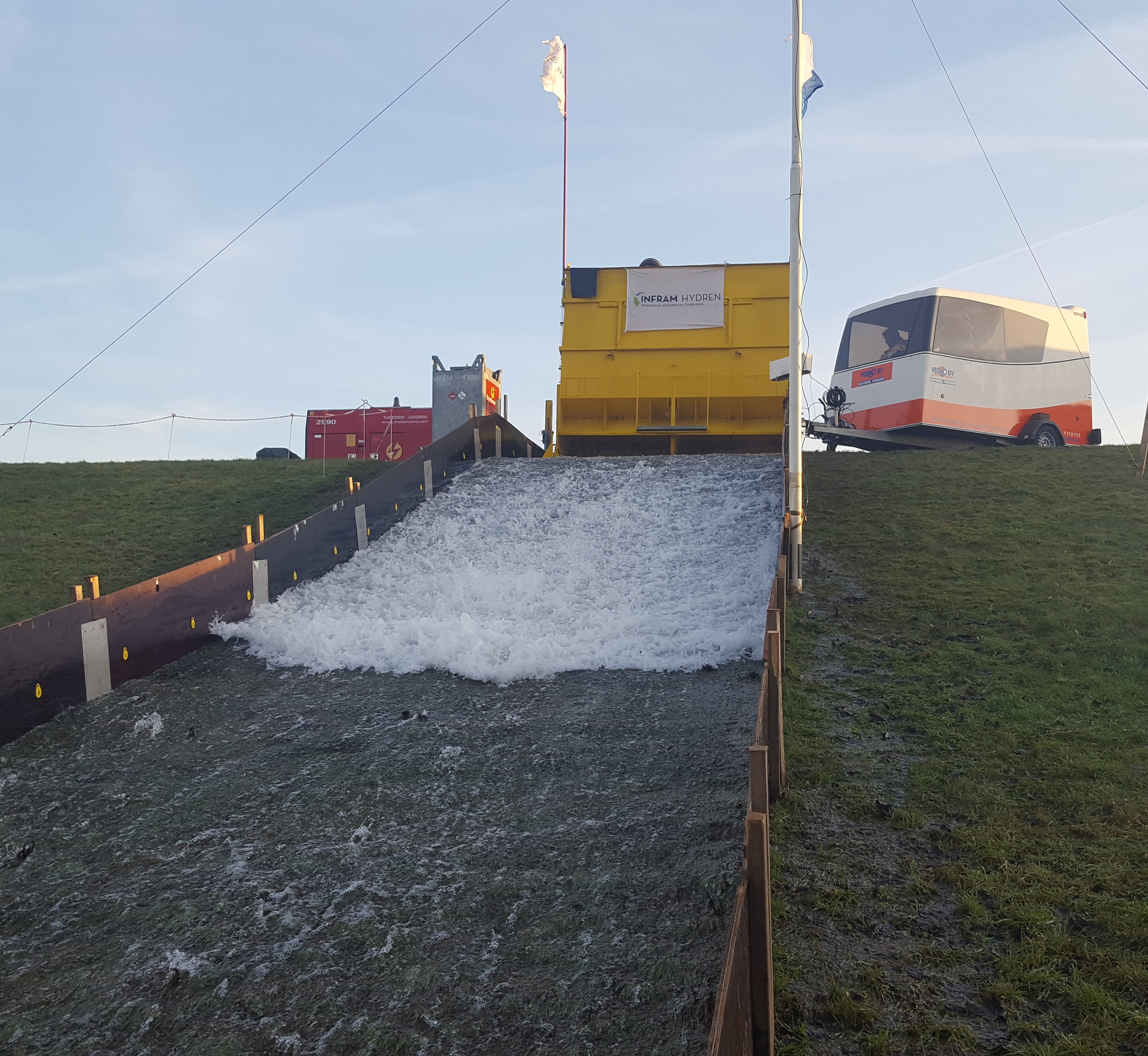
Simulation of overtopping on the inner slope of the IJsseldijk in Zwolle

When there is water on both sides of a barrier (such as in the case of a harbour dam, breakwater or closure dam), wave overtopping over the dam will also generate waves on the other side of the dam. This is called wave transmission. To determine the amount of wave transmission, it is not necessary to determine the amount of overtopping. The transmission depends only on the wave height on the outer side, the freeboard, and the roughness of the slope. For a smooth slope, the transmission coefficient (the relationship between the wave on the inside of the dam and the incoming wave) is:

$$K_T= \left[ {-0.3 \frac{R_c}{H_{m0}}+0.75 \left( {1- exp(-0.5 \xi_{0p}) }\right) }\right] \cdot ({cos\beta})^{3/2}$$

In which ξ_{0p} is the Iribarren number based on the peak period of the waves, and β is the angle of incidence of the waves.

== Overtopping simulation ==
In order to assess the safety and resilience of dikes, as well as the robustness of the grass lining on their crests and landward slopes, a wave overtopping simulator can be employed. The most onerous wave conditions for which a dike is designed occur relatively rarely, so using a wave overtopping simulator enables in-situ replication of anticipated conditions on the dike itself. This allows the responsible organisation overseeing the structure to evaluate its capacity to withstand predicted wave overtopping during specific extreme scenarios.

During these tests, the wave overtopping simulator is positioned on the dike's crest and continuously filled with water. The device features valves at its base that can be opened to release varying volumes of water, thereby simulating a wide range of wave overtopping events. This approach helps ensure that the dike's integrity is accurately and effectively assessed.

In the case of dikes with grass slopes, another test method is to use a sod puller to determine the tensile strength of the sod, which can then be translated into strength under the load caused by wave overtopping. In addition to simulating wave overtopping, the simulation of wave impacts and wave run-up is possible with a specially developed generator and simulator.

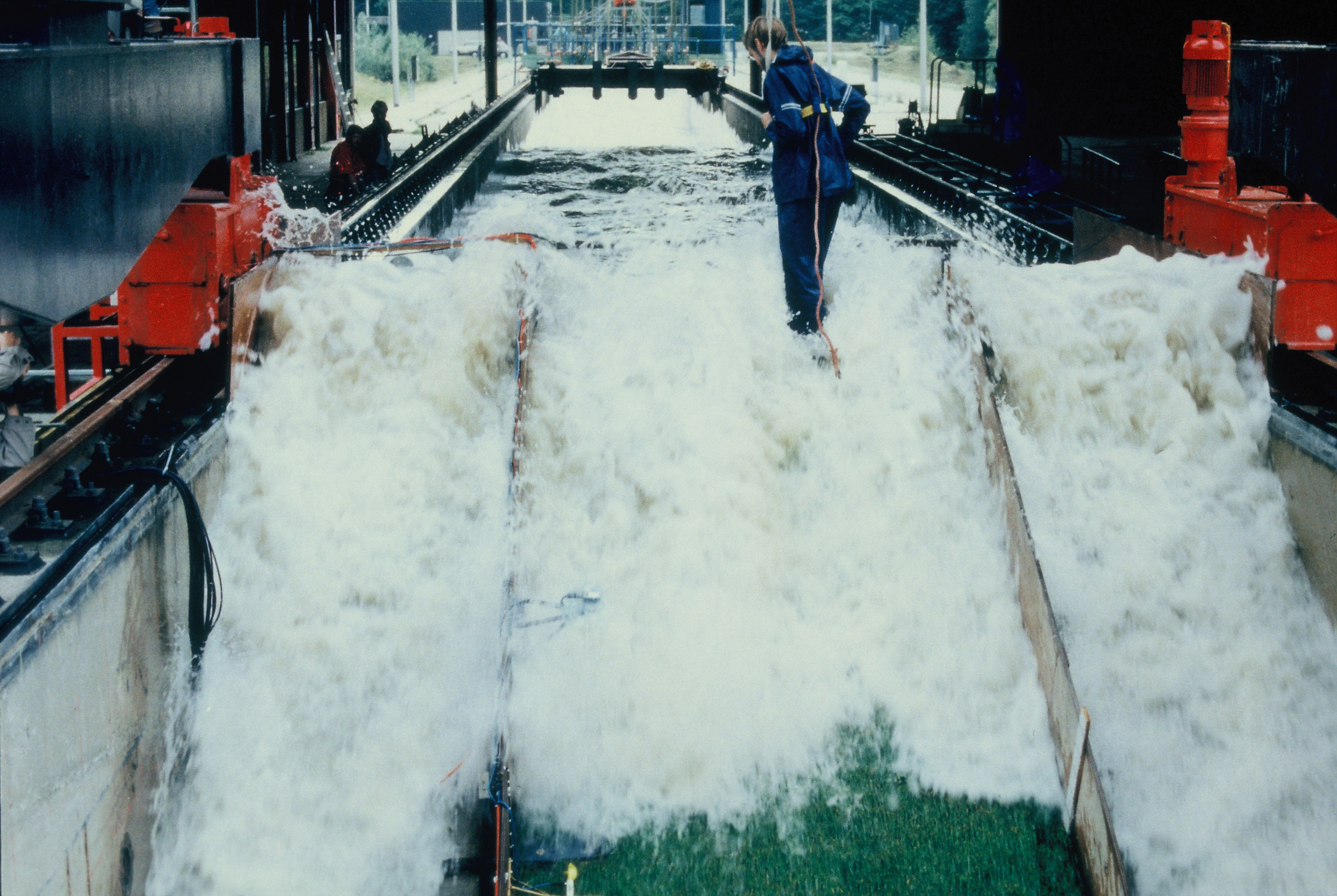
Grass dike erosion trials during overtopping, undertaken by Rijkswaterstaat in 1992

== See also ==
- Coastal Engineering
