= Yoshimi Goda =

Japanese civil engineer (1935–2012)

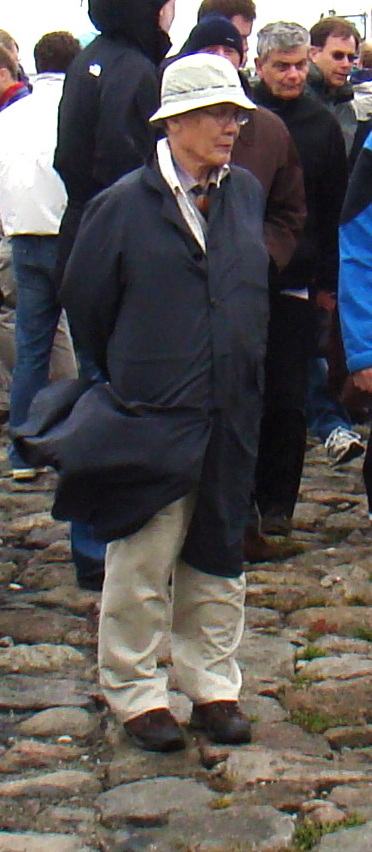
- Goda in Hamburg, 2008
- Born: 24 February 1935; Sapporo, Hokkaido, Japan
- Died: 19 January 2012 (aged 76)
- Education: University of Tokyo; Massachusetts Institute of Technology
- Known for: Goda's formula for wave pressure; Random seas and design of maritime structures
- Awards: ASCE International Coastal Engineering Award (1989); JSCE Publication Award (1997); JSCE Achievement Award (2003); Order of the Sacred Treasure (2006)
- Scientific career
- Fields: Civil Engineering; Hydraulic Engineering
- Workplaces: Ministry of Transport (Japan); Yokohama National University
- Thesis: Study on wave pressure acting on breakwaters (1976)

Yoshimi Goda (Japanese: 合田 良実, Hepburn: Gōda Yoshimi; 24 February 1935 – 19 January 2012) was a Japanese civil engineer who made significant contributions to coastal engineering in Japan and internationally. He undertook a large volume of research on coastal engineering problems, and developed methods for the design of monolithic breakwaters.

Prior to the 1950s, the concept of the significant wave (H_{s}), was the fundamental tool used to analyse wave behaviour, in terms of interaction with beaches and coastal engineering structures. Goda was instrumental in the move to characterise the behaviour of sea waves as a stochastic process, involving spectral and statistical analysis, which began to be gradually incorporated into coastal engineering during the 1970s and 1980s.

The random wave concept is now used extensively in the engineering of maritime structures, and Goda's wave pressure formula, a design method for vertical breakwaters based on a quasi-static approach, is named for him and used worldwide.

== Life and career ==
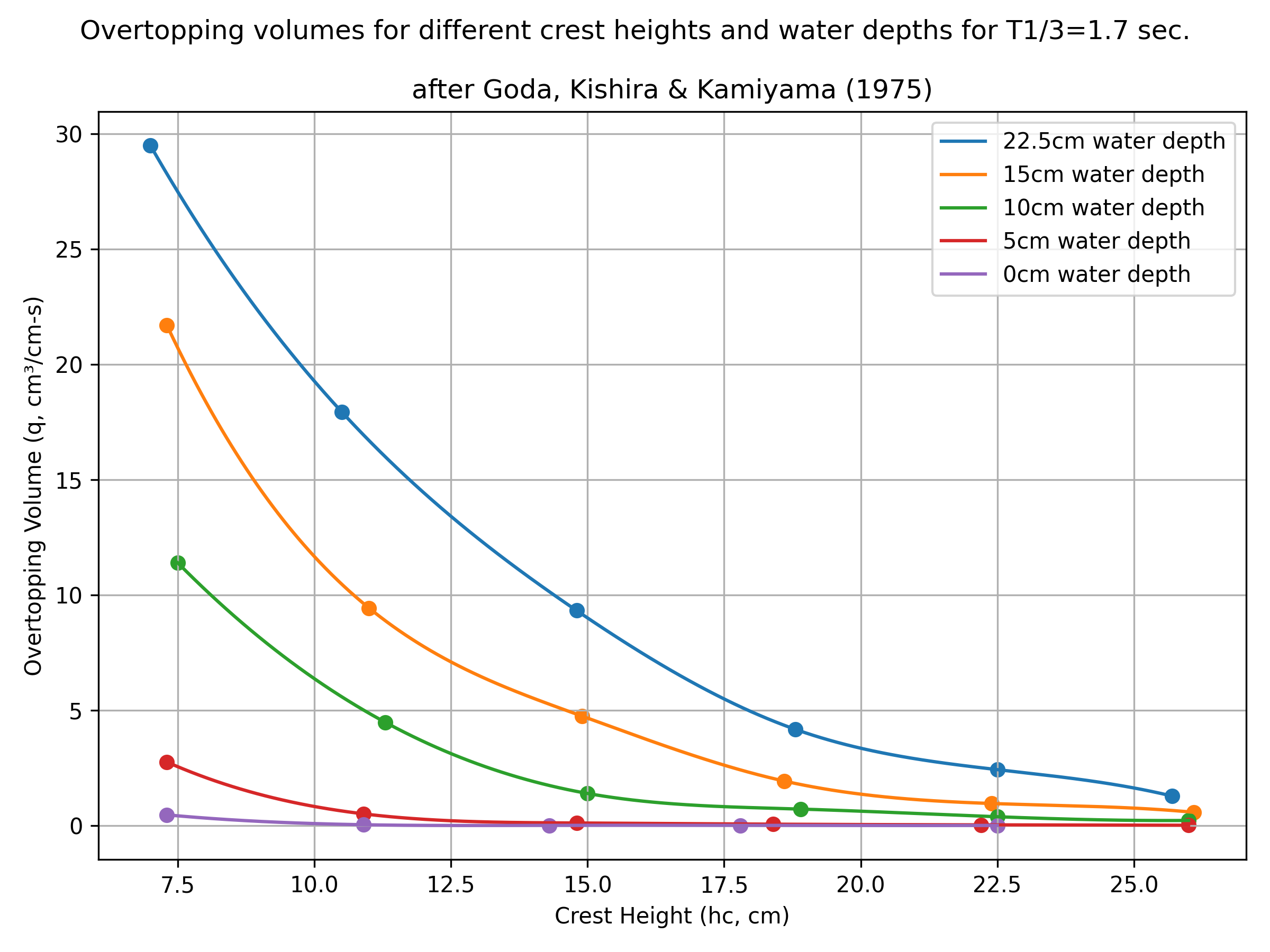
This graph shows some results from laboratory experiments in 1975 by Goda, in collaboration with Kishira and Kamiyama, on wave overtopping. Goda subjected scale model vertical sea walls to overtopping. The graph shows how an increased water depth in front of the structure results in a higher volume of overtopping, whilst increasing the crest height reduces it. In these graphs, the overtopping is a function of water depth and wave period, however current practice in the EurOtop Manual is to use the wave height. Goda's findings are however equally valid, and Hendrik Lorentz found similar results during measurements for the Zuiderzee Works in the 1920s.

Goda was born in Sapporo in 1935, the son of Ichiji and Umeno Goda (née Tanaka). After graduating in Civil Engineering from The University of Tokyo in 1957, he joined the Port and Harbour Research Institute (PHRI) of the Japanese Ministry of Transport. In 1961, he was selected as part of a Japanese government initiative to conduct hydraulic and coastal research at the Massachusetts Institute of Technology (MIT) in the United States, under the guidance of Professor Arthur T. Ippen. His research at MIT focused on the theoretical analysis of resonance in harbours.

In May 1967, he became Head of the PHRI Wave Research Department, and received a doctorate in engineering from the University of Tokyo in 1976, publishing a Ph.D. thesis entitled Study of wave pressure acting on breakwaters. He remained at the PHRI during this time, becoming Director General in 1986. In 1988, he left the PHRI and took up an appointment as professor at Yokohama National University, a position in which he remained until retiring in 2000, although he continued to be actively involved with the institution as Professor Emeritus after this date, undertaking research and publishing frequently.

Throughout his career, he made significant contributions to the field of coastal engineering. His most notable work includes the development of a formula for wave pressure. He also conducted insightful analysis of random wave transformations, and undertook comprehensive studies on the statistical properties of random seas. These discoveries were incorporated into Japanese standards for designing port and harbour facilities. He published the book Random Seas and Design of Maritime Structures which detailed the concept of random wave processes, stochastic wave processes, and spectral behaviour to students and practitioners.

In a 1999 paper, Goda demonstrated that the way waves decrease in energy as they move in shallow water can be predicted using his model of how waves randomly break. He compared different methods of predicting how waves spread out and move in different directions, showing how these methods are related, and provided a clear picture of wave patterns.

Other significant areas of research by Goda included work on the estimation of sediment transport in multi-directional wave fields, the characteristics and behaviour of waves and currents around reef systems, and the energy transformation processes associated with irregular waves.

Goda also undertook research, published and lectured internationally, attending several international conferences including the International Conference on Coastal Engineering. He was chair of the Japanese Society of Civil Engineers' Coastal Engineering Committee conference in 1991, held at Kanazawa, and the 1992 conference in Okinawa.

In 2007, he gave a keynote lecture at the 9th International Summer Symposium of the Japan Society of Civil Engineers in Yokohama, and delivered the keynote lecture entitled Coastal Protection Planning against Sea Level Rise at the 9th International Conference on Coasts, Ports, and Marine Structures (ICOMPAS) in Tehran in 2010.

Amongst the many awards and honours Goda received in his career were the American Society of Civil Engineers International Coastal Engineering Award (1989), the Japan Society of Civil Engineers Publication Award (1997) and Achievement Award (2003), and the Order of the Sacred Treasure (2006). Goda married Toshiko Fukuda in 1959, and the couple had five children.

== Research and publications ==
Goda undertook research throughout his career and published widely on coastal engineering topics, including the use of statistical analysis to formulate design wave heights, wave overtopping, and monolithic breakwaters. Along with publishing in a variety of Japanese and international journals, he served as the honorary editor of the Coastal Engineering Journal of the Japan Society of Civil Engineers.

In 1977, he published the engineering textbook Wave-resistant engineering: Wave-resistant design of harbours and coastal structures, which proved popular with coastal engineering students, and was subsequently published in English translation (as Random Seas and Design of Maritime Structures) in 1985, with second and third editions published in 2000 and 2010.

He published Introduction to Civil Engineering and Civilization History in 2001, a book aimed at providing a historical overview of the relationship between civil engineering and civilisation. In 2003, he published a set of workable formulas for simplified wind-wave prediction, based on previous work by the South African engineer Basil Wrigley Wilson and other Japanese researchers, to be utilised by engineers for preliminary design work.

In 2012, shortly before his death, he published the book Coastal Engineering: Its birth and development, his attempt to summarise developments in coastal engineering from 1950, both in Japan and internationally. Goda had previously published work on similar historical themes, including a paper in 1999 in which he analysed the historical development of the mathematical theory of waves, and traced the development of coastal engineering from Leonardo da Vinci up to the present day.

== The Goda Library ==
The Hydraulic Laboratory building at the Port and Airport Research Institute (PARI) in Yokosuka includes the Goda Library, which houses a collection of Goda's books, magazines, and written works. The collection includes materials reflecting his research life, such as research notes and diaries with personal annotations. The library is open to visitors, but does not offer lending services.

== Selected bibliography ==
A selection of books published by Goda are given below, along with many of the papers he authored, or co-authored.

=== Books ===
- Goda, Y. (2010). Random Seas and Design of Maritime Structures. World Scientific Publishing. ISBN 978-981-4282-39-0. Link.
- Goda, Y. (2008). 耐波工学 港湾・海岸構造物の耐波設計 (Wave-Resistant Engineering: Design of Wave-Resistant Port and Coastal Structures). Kajima Publishing Co., Ltd. ISBN 978-430-6023-99-4. Link.
- Goda, Y. (2001). 土木文明史概論 (An Overview of Civil Engineering Civilisation). Kajima Publishing Co., Ltd. ISBN 978-4306-022-35-5. Link.
- Goda, Y. (1998). 海岸・港湾 (Coast and Harbour). Shokokusha Publishing Co., Ltd. ISBN 978-4395-410-67-5. Link.

=== Published papers ===
- Goda, Y. (2013). 'Empirical Formulation of Sediment Pickup Rate in Terms of Wave Energy Flux Dissipation Rate'. Coastal Engineering Journal, 55(4), 1350012-1-1350012-17. (Published posthumously).
- Goda, Y. (2011). 'Plotting-Position Estimator for the L-Moment Method and Quantile Confidence Interval for the GEV, GPA, and Weibull Distributions Applied for Extreme Wave Analysis'. Coastal Engineering Journal, 53(2), 111-149.
- Goda, Y. (2011). 'Inherent Negative Bias of Quantile Estimates of Annual Maximum Data Due to Sample Size Effect: A Numerical Simulation Study'. Coastal Engineering Journal, 53(4), 397-429.
- Goda, Y. (2011). 'A Note on Sample Skewness of Asymmetric Distribution'. Coastal Engineering Journal, 53(4), 567-576.
- Goda, Y. (2010). 'Reanalysis of Regular and Random Breaking Wave Statistics'. Coastal Engineering Journal, 52(1), 71-106.
- Goda, Y. (2008). 'Wave Setup and Longshore Currents Induced by Directional Spectral Waves: Prediction Formulas Based on Numerical Computation Results'. Coastal Engineering Journal, 50(4), 397-440.
- Goda, Y., and Kudaka, M. (2007). 'On the Role of Spectral Width and Shape Parameters in Control of Individual Wave Height Distribution'. Coastal Engineering Journal, 49(3), 311-335.
- Goda, Y. (2004). 'A 2-D Random Wave Transformation Model with Gradational Breaker Index'. Coastal Engineering Journal, 46(1), 1-38.
- Goda, Y. (2001). 'Performance-Based Design of Caisson Breakwaters with New Approach to Extreme Wave Statistics'. Coastal Engineering Journal, 43(4), 289-316.
- Goda, Y., and Takagi, H. (2000). 'A Reliability Design Method of Caisson Breakwaters with Optimal Wave Heights'. Coastal Engineering Journal, 42(4), 357-387.
- Goda, Y. (1999). 'A Comparative Review on the Functional Forms of Directional Wave Spectrum'. Coastal Engineering Journal, 41(1), 1-20.
- Goda, Y. (1998). 'An Overview of Coastal Engineering with Emphasis on Random Wave Approach'. Coastal Engineering Journal, 40(1), 1-21.
- Goda, Y. (1997). 'Book review / Analyse bibliographique'. Journal of Hydraulic Research, 35(3), 431-431.
- Mathiesen, M., Goda, Y., Hawkes, P. J., Mansard, E., Martín, M. J., Peltier, E., Thompson, E. F., and Van Vledder, G. (1994). 'Recommended practice for extreme wave analysis'. Journal of Hydraulic Research, 32(6), 803-814.
- Kittitanasuan, W., Goda, Y., and Shiobara, T. (1993). 'Deformation of Nonlinear Waves on a Rectangular Step'. Coastal Engineering in Japan, 36(2), 133-153.
- Goda, Y., and Watanabe, N. (1991). 'A Longshore Current Formula for Random Breaking Waves'. Coastal Engineering in Japan, 34(2), 159-175.
- Goda, Y. (1988). 'Statistical Variability of Sea State Parameters as a Function of Wave Spectrum'. Coastal Engineering in Japan, 31(1), 39-52.
- Goda, Y. (1986). 'Effect of Wave Tilting on Zero-Crossing Wave Heights and Periods'. Coastal Engineering in Japan, 29(1), 79-90.
- Ojima, R., Suzumura, S., and Goda, Y. (1984). 'Theory and Experiments on Extractable Wave Power by an Oscillating Water-Column Type Breakwater Caisson'. Coastal Engineering in Japan, 27(1), 315-326.
- Goda, Y. (1975). 'Irregular Wave Deformation in the Surf Zone'. Coastal Engineering in Japan, 18(1), 13-26.
- Goda, Y. (1973). 'Wave Forces on Circular Cylinders Erected Upon Reefs'. Coastal Engineering in Japan, 16(1), 137-146.
- Takayama, T., and Goda, Y. (1973). 'Wave Forces on a Semi-Submerged Vertical Cylinder of Elliptical Shape'. Coastal Engineering in Japan, 16(1), 147-164.
- Goda, Y. (1972). 'Experiments on the Transition from Nonbreaking to Postbreaking Wave Pressures'. Coastal Engineering in Japan, 15(1), 81-90.
- Goda, Y. (1971). 'Expected Rate of Irregular Wave Overtopping of Seawalls'. Coastal Engineering in Japan, 14(1), 43-51.
- Goda, Y. (1967). 'The Fourth Order Approximation to the Pressure of Standing Waves'. Coastal Engineering in Japan, 10(1), 1-11.
