= Wave setup =

Increase in mean water level due to the presence of breaking waves

In fluid dynamics, wave setup is the increase in mean water level due to the presence of breaking waves. Similarly, wave setdown is a wave-induced decrease of the mean water level before the waves break (during the shoaling process). For short, the whole phenomenon is often denoted as wave setup, including both increase and decrease of mean elevation. This setup is primarily present in and near the coastal surf zone. Besides a spatial variation in the (mean) wave setup, also a variation in time may be present – known as surf beat – causing infragravity wave radiation.

Wave setup can be mathematically modeled by considering the variation in radiation stress. Radiation stress is the tensor of excess horizontal-momentum fluxes due to the presence of the waves.

== In and near the coastal surf zone ==
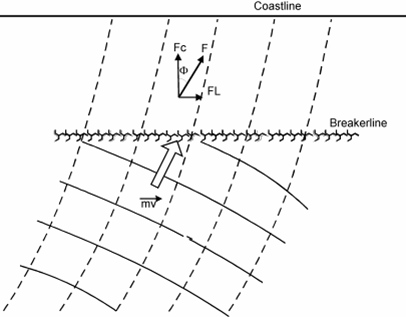
Transfer of momentum into a force parallel and perpendicular to the coast

As a progressive wave approaches shore and the water depth decreases, the wave height increases due to wave shoaling. As a result, there is additional wave-induced flux of horizontal momentum. The horizontal momentum equations of the mean flow requires this additional wave-induced flux to be balanced: this causes a decrease in the mean water level before the waves break, called a "setdown".

After the waves break, the wave energy flux is no longer constant, but decreasing due to energy dissipation. The radiation stress therefore decreases after the break point, causing a free surface level increase to balance: wave setup. Both of the above descriptions are specifically for beaches with mild bed slope.

Wave setup is particularly of concern during storm events, when the effects of big waves generated by wind from the storm are able to increase the mean sea level (by wave setup), enhancing the risks of damage to coastal infrastructure.

== Wave setup value ==
The radiation stress pushes the water towards the coast, and is then pushed up, causing an increase in the water level. At a given moment, that increase is such that its hydrostratic pressure is equal to the radiation stress. From this equilibrium the wave setup can be calculated. The maximum increase in water level is then:

$$z= \frac{5}{16} \gamma H_b$$

where H_{b} is the wave height at the breaker line and γ is the breaker index (wave height/water depth ratio at breaking for individual waves, usually γ = 0.7 - 0.8). Incidentally, due to this phenomenon, a small reduction in water level occurs just seaward of the breaker line, in the order of 20% of the wave set-up.
The wave setup at ocean beaches can be significant. For example, a wave with a height of 5 m (on deep water) and a period of 12 s, at perpendicular incidence and γ = 0.7, gives a wave setup of 1.2 m.

== Current due to wave setup ==
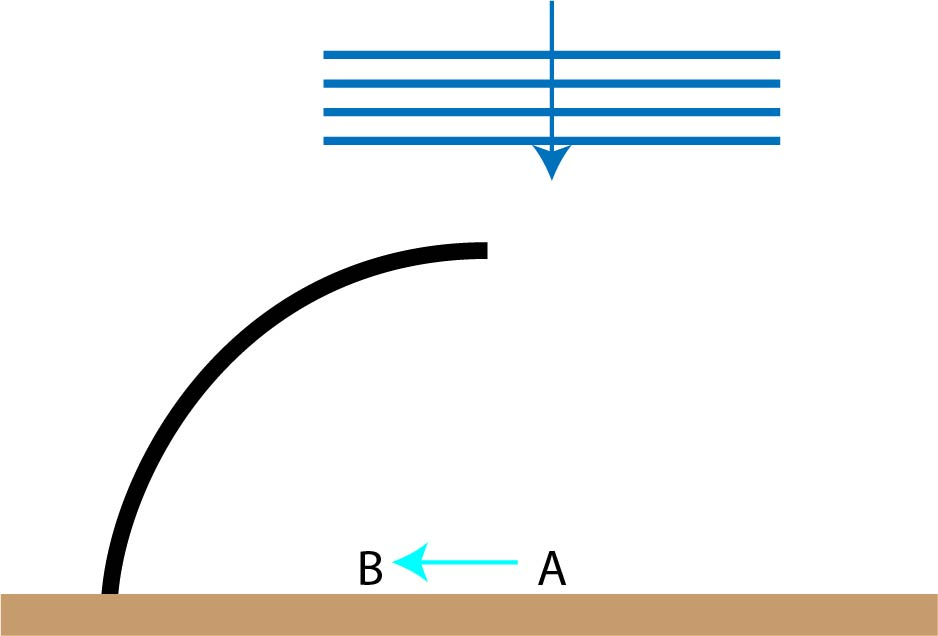
Wave Setup Driven Current

Wave setup can lead to considerable currents along the coast. In the accompanying figure, a harbour is drawn with waves that come perpendicular to the coast. At point A, the breaking of the waves causes a water level increase. Suppose it is 1.2 m as in the example above. At point B in the harbour (suppose that is approx. 500 m from point A) there are few breaking waves due to the protection of the breakwater (there is a small amount of wave action due to diffraction).

Suppose that the wave setup at this point is only 0.2 m. Then there is a water level difference of 1 m over those 500 m, so a gradient of 0.002. If this is filled in e.g. the formula of Chézy it gives:

$v = C \sqrt{h i} = 50 \cdot \sqrt{2 \cdot 0.002} \approx 3$ m/s.

This speed is not negligible, and also results in a large sand transport into the harbour. A harbour with a shape like the one outlined here is usually built this way because the predominant wave direction here comes from the left. Along this coast there is then a wave induced sediment transport from left to right, and based on this it is expected that siltation will occur on the left side of the harbour and erosion on the right side of the harbor (so from A further to the right). Based on standard longshore transport calculations, no siltation is therefore expected at this port. However, the current due to wave setup can in this case indeed cause sedimentation.

== Note ==
Wave setup should not be confused with wave run-up (the rising of the tongue of a wave on a slope) or with wind setup (surge, raising of the water level at the coast due to wind pressure).

== See also ==
- Coastal flooding
