= Basil Wrigley Wilson =

South African oceanographer and civil engineer

- Born: 16 June 1909; Cape Town, South Africa
- Died: 9 February 1996 (aged 86)
- Education: University of Cape Town; University of Illinois
- Known for: Wilson's formulas for simplified wind-wave prediction
- Awards: ASCE A.M. Wellington Prize (1952); ASCE Norman medal (1969); ASCE Moffat-Nichol award (1983); Member of the National Academy of Engineering (1984)
- Scientific career
- Fields: Civil Engineering; Physical Oceanography; Hydraulic Engineering
- Workplaces: South African Railways and Harbours Administration; Texas A&M University
- Thesis: Research and Model Studies on Range Action in Table Bay Harbour, Cape Town (1951)
- Doctoral advisor: J.S. de V. von Willich
- Other academic advisors: Dr. C.V. von Abo

Basil Wrigley Wilson (16 June 1909 – 9 February 1996) was an oceanographic engineer and researcher in the field of coastal engineering who made significant contributions to the study of ocean waves, ship motion, and mooring technology.

== Life and career ==
Wilson was born in Cape Town to expatriate English parents George Hough Wilson and Sarah Anne Wilson (née Hearn). His father was a journalist and editor of the Cape Times, and his grandmother was related to William Wrigley Jr. of the Wrigley Company, hence Basil's middle name.

He studied Civil engineering at the University of Cape Town, graduating with a Bachelor of Science degree in 1931. A year later, he took up employment as an engineer with the South African Railways and Harbours Administration, where he remained until 1952. During this time, he developed the first hydraulic model of a harbour in South Africa, at Gqeberha.

In 1942 he oversaw the design and operation of a large physical model of Table Bay and its harbour, and conducted experiments on methods for the control and reduction of the effects of storm surges, using much of the work as the basis for his Doctor of Science dissertation at the University of Cape Town in 1951.

In 1952 he moved to the United States and undertook a teaching and research position at Texas A&M University. He became a US Citizen in 1956. In addition to work on the dynamics of mooring lines for large ships, he developed a procedure for predicting the height and period characteristics of waves. He also undertook work on storm surges caused by hurricanes, researching the effects in New York Harbor and the Gulf of Mexico.

In 1968, Wilson entered private practice where he undertook engineering consulting work for various clients on subjects including earthquake engineering, tsunami hazards, and port engineering.

== Wilson's formulas for simplified wind-wave prediction ==
In 1965, Wilson proposed a method which can be used to approximate the significant wave height H_{1/3} and period T_{1/3} of wind waves generated by a constant wind of speed U blowing over a fetch length F. The units for these quantities are as follows:

- H_{1/3} in metres (m)
- T_{1/3} in seconds (s)
- U in metres per second (m/s)
- F in metres (m)

Under conditions were the wind blows for a sufficiently long time, for example during a prolonged storm, the wave height and period can be calculated as follows:

$$gH_{1/3} / U^2 = 0.30 \left\{1-\left[1+0.004 \left(gF/U^2\right)^{1/2}\right]^{-2}\right\}$$
$$gT_{1/3} / (2\pi U) = 1.37 \left\{1-\left[1+0.008 \left(gF/U^2\right)^{1/3}\right]^{-5}\right\}$$

In these formulae, g denotes the acceleration due to gravity, which is approximately 9.807 m/s^{2}. The wind speed U is measured at an elevation of 10 metres above the sea surface. Wilson's formulae apply when the duration of the wind blowing is sufficiently long, as when the wind blows for only a limited time, waves cannot attain the full height and period corresponding to the wind speed and fetch length. Work by Yoshimi Goda and other Japanese researchers subsequently provided modifications to the formulae to consider these effects.

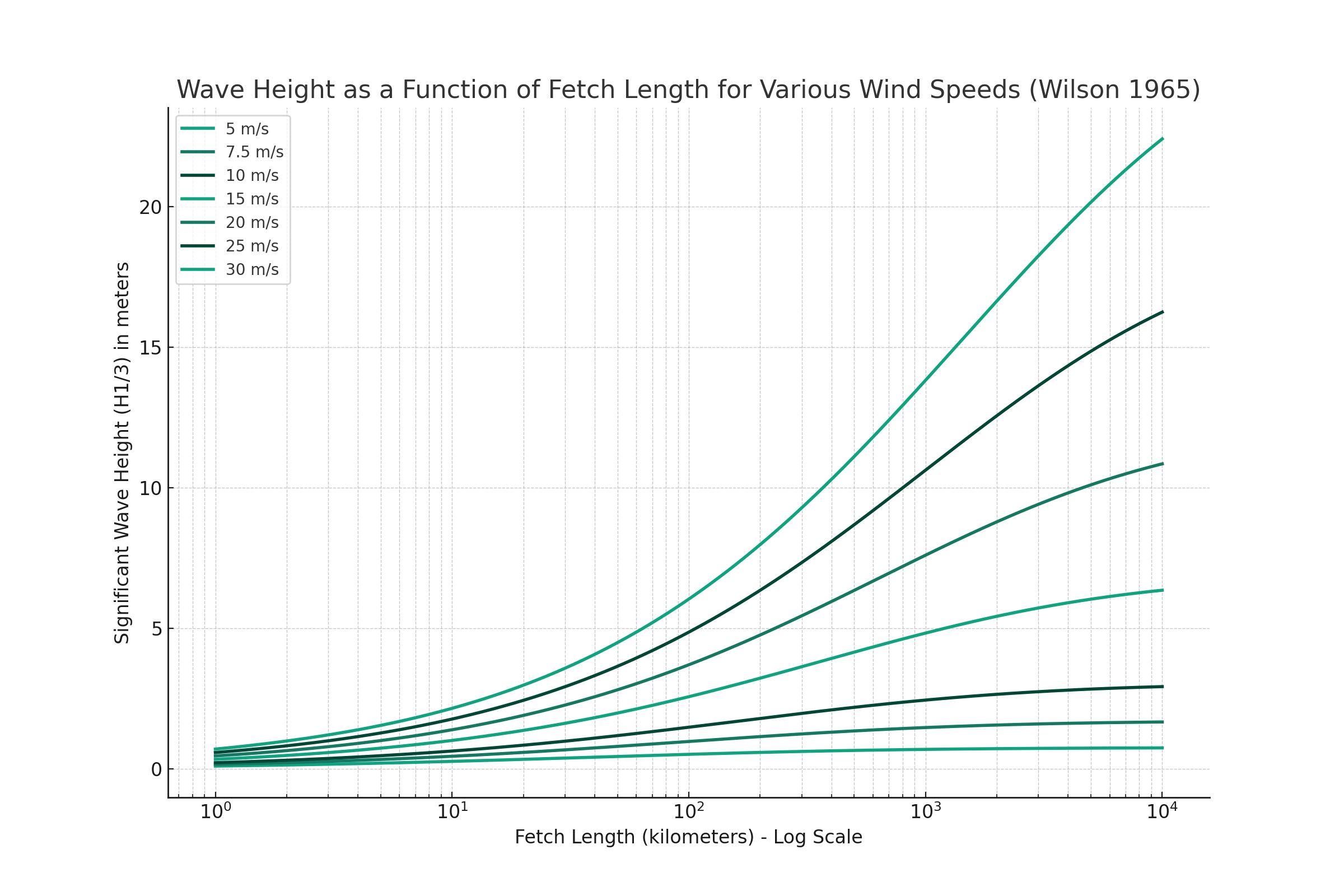
Graph showing wave height predictions using Wilson's formula (1965)

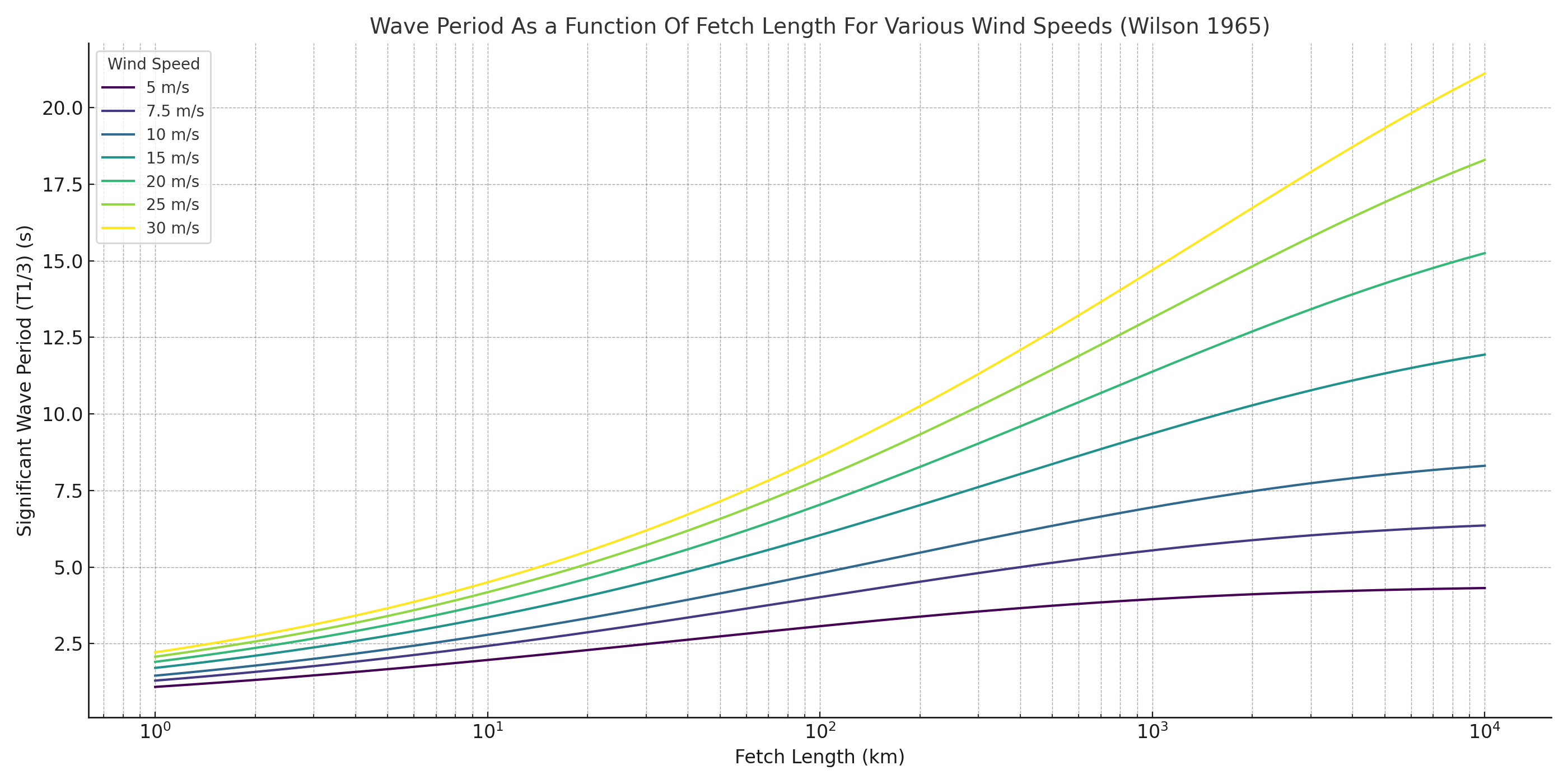
Graph showing wave period predictions using Wilson's formula (1965)

Goda adapted Wilson's formula with a simple equation which is first used to calculate the minimum fetch (F_{min}):

$$F_{\text{min}} = 1.0 t^{1.37} U^{0.63}$$

In this equation, t is the wind duration (in hours) and U is the wind speed, in metres per second. If F > F_{min}, then the wave growth is limited by the wind duration, and F_{min} is used instead of F in Wilson's equations. If F < F_{min}, the wave growth is limited by fetch length, and F is used.

== Recognition and later life ==
Wilson was recognised during his career with several awards, including the American Society of Civil Engineers Arthur M. Wellington Prize (1952), Norman Medal (1969), and the Moffatt-Nichol Harbor and Coastal Engineering Award (1983). He was also recognised by the Institution of Civil Engineers and South African Institution of Civil Engineers. In 1984, he was elected to the National Academy of Engineering.

He died in 1996 in Pasadena, California, survived by his wife and four children.
