= Iribarren number =

Dimensionless parameter

Spilling breaker.

Plunging breaker.

Collapsing breaker.

Surging breaker.

Breaking wave types: free surface and bubble plumes, as redrawn from photographs taken during a wave flume experiment.

In fluid dynamics, the Iribarren number or Iribarren parameter – also known as the surf similarity parameter and breaker parameter – is a dimensionless parameter used to model several effects of (breaking) surface gravity waves on beaches and coastal structures. The parameter is named after the Basque Spanish engineer Ramón Iribarren Cavanilles (1900–1967), who introduced it to describe the occurrence of wave breaking on sloping beaches. The parameter used to describe breaking wave types on beaches; or wave run-up on – and reflection by – beaches, breakwaters and dikes.

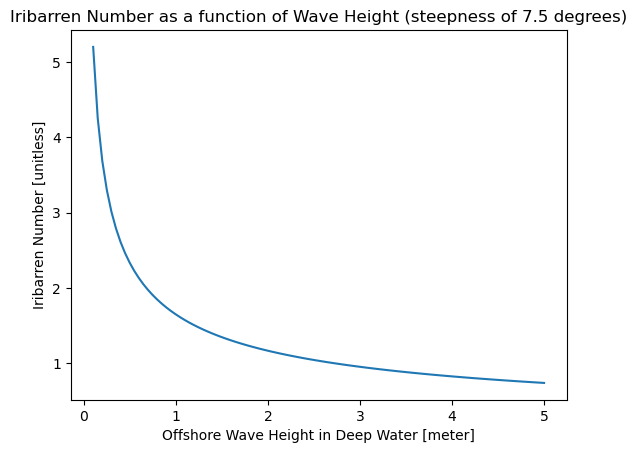
Iribarren Number (ξ_{0}) as a function of wave height with constant beach steepness of 7.5 degrees.

Iribarren's work was further developed by Jurjen Battjes in 1974, who named the parameter after Iribarren.

The importance of this parameter for so many aspects of waves breaking on slopes appears to justify that it be given a special name. In the author's opinion it is appropriate to call it the "Iribarren number" (denoted by "Ir"), in honor of the man who introduced it and who has made many other valuable contributions to our knowledge of water waves.

— Jurjen A. Battjes, "Surf Similarity", Proceedings of the 14th International Conference on Coastal Engineering (1974)

== Definition ==
The Iribarren number which is often denoted as Ir or ξ – is defined as:

$\xi = \frac{\tan \alpha}{\sqrt{H/L_0}},$ with $L_0 = \frac{g}{2\pi}\, T^2,$

where ξ is the Iribarren number, ${\displaystyle\alpha}$ is the angle of the seaward slope of a structure, H is the wave height, L_{0} is the deep-water wavelength, T is the period and g is the gravitational acceleration. Depending on the application, different definitions of H and T are used, for example: for periodic waves the wave height H_{0} at deep water or the breaking wave height H_{b} at the edge of the surf zone. Or, for random waves, the significant wave height H_{s} at a certain location.

== Breaker types ==
Breaker types:Spilling, Plunging, Collapsing, and Surging

The type of breaking wave – spilling, plunging, collapsing or surging – depends on the Iribarren number. According to Battjes (1974), for periodic waves propagating on a plane beach, two possible choices for the Iribarren number are:

$\xi_0 = \frac{\tan \alpha}{\sqrt{H_0 / L_0}}$ or $\xi_b = \frac{\tan \alpha}{\sqrt{H_b / L_0}},$

where H_{0} is the offshore wave height in deep water, and H_{b} is the value of the wave height at the break point (where the waves start to break). Then the breaker types dependence on the Iribarren number (either ξ_{0} or ξ_{b}) is approximately:

breaker type	ξ_{0}–range	ξ_{b}–range
surging or collapsing	ξ_{0} > 3.3	ξ_{b} > 2.0
plunging	0.5 < ξ_{0} < 3.3	0.4 < ξ_{b} < 2.0
spilling	ξ_{0} < 0.5	ξ_{b} < 0.4
