= Wind setup =

Rise of water due to wind blowing over the water surface

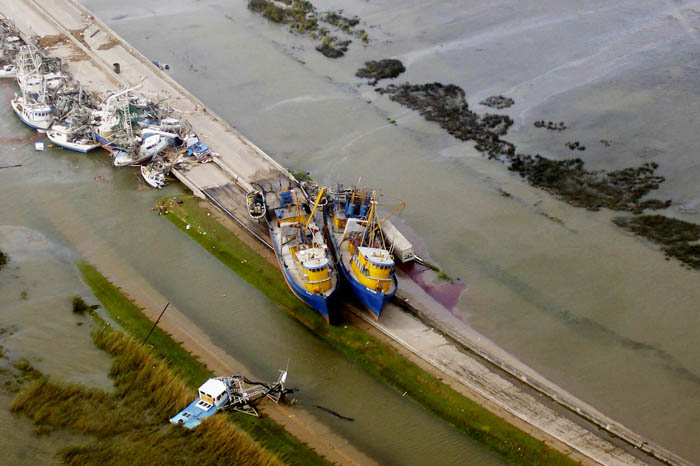
Effect of wind setup during Hurricane Katrina in 2005

Wind setup, also known as wind effect or storm effect, refers to the rise in water level in seas, lakes, or other large bodies of water caused by winds pushing the water in a specific direction. As the wind moves across the water’s surface, it applies shear stress to the water, generating a wind-driven current. When this current encounters a shoreline, the water level increases due to the accumulation of water, which creates a hydrostatic counterforce that balances the shear force applied by the wind.

During storms, wind setup forms part of the overall storm surge. For example, in the Netherlands, wind setup during a storm surge can raise water levels by as much as 3 metres above normal tidal levels. In tropical regions, such as the Caribbean, wind setup during cyclones can elevate water levels by up to 5 metres. This phenomenon becomes especially significant when water is funnelled into shallow or narrow areas, leading to higher storm surges.

Examples of the effects of wind setup include Hurricanes Gamma and Delta in 2020, during which wind setup was a major factor when strong winds and atmospheric pressure drops caused higher-than-expected coastal flooding across the Yucatán Peninsula in Mexico. Similarly, in California’s Suisun Marsh, wind setup has been shown to be a significant factor affecting local water levels, with strong winds pushing water into levees, contributing to frequent breaches and flooding.

== Observation ==
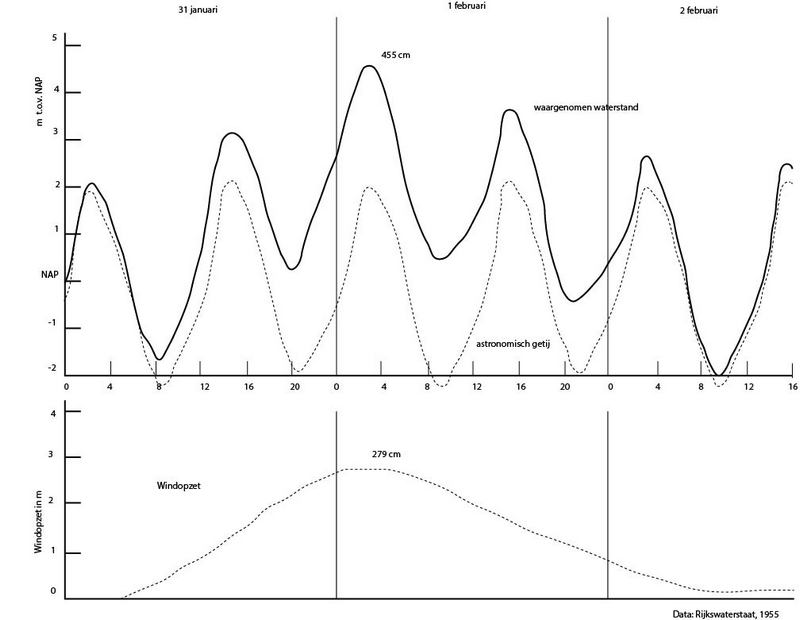
Observation of wind setup in Vlissingen in 1953

In lakes, wind setup often leads to noticeable fluctuations in water levels. This effect is particularly clear in lakes with well-regulated water levels, such as the IJsselmeer, where the relationship between wind speed, water depth, and fetch length can be accurately measured and observed.

At sea, however, wind setup is typically masked by other factors, such as tidal variations. To measure the wind setup effect in coastal areas, the (calculated) astronomical tide is subtracted from the observed water level. For instance, during the North Sea flood of 1953, the highest water level along the Dutch coast was recorded at 2.79 metres at the Vlissingen tidal station, while the highest wind setup—measuring 3.52 metres—was observed at Scheveningen.

The highest wind setup ever recorded in the Netherlands, reaching 3.63 metres, occurred in Dintelsas, Steenbergen during the 1953 flood. However, globally, tropical regions like the Gulf of Mexico and the Caribbean often experience even higher wind setups during hurricane events, underscoring the importance of this phenomenon in coastal and flood management strategies.

== Calculation of wind setup ==
Based on the equilibrium between the shear stress due to the wind on the water and the hydrostatic back pressure, the following equation is used:

$$\frac{dh}{dx}=\frac{\kappa u^2 \cos \phi}{gh}$$

in which:

h = water depth
x = distance
u= wind speed
$\kappa = c_w \frac{\rho_{air}}{\rho_{water}}$, Ippen suggests $\kappa$ = 3.3*10^{−6}
$\phi$ = angle of the wind relative to the coast
g = acceleration of gravity
c_{w} has a value between 0.8*10^{−3} and 3.0*10^{−3}

=== Application at open coasts ===
For an open coast, the equation becomes:

$$\Delta h = \sqrt{2 \kappa \frac{u^2}{g} F \cos \phi + h^2} - h$$

in which

Δh = wind setup
F = fetch length, this is the distance the wind blows over the water

However, this formula is not always applicable, particularly when dealing with open coasts or varying water depths. In such cases, a more complex approach is needed, which involves solving the differential equation using a one- or two-dimensional grid. This method, combined with real-world data, is used in countries like the Netherlands to predict wind setup along the coast during potential storms.

=== Application at (shallow) lakes and confined small-fetch areas ===
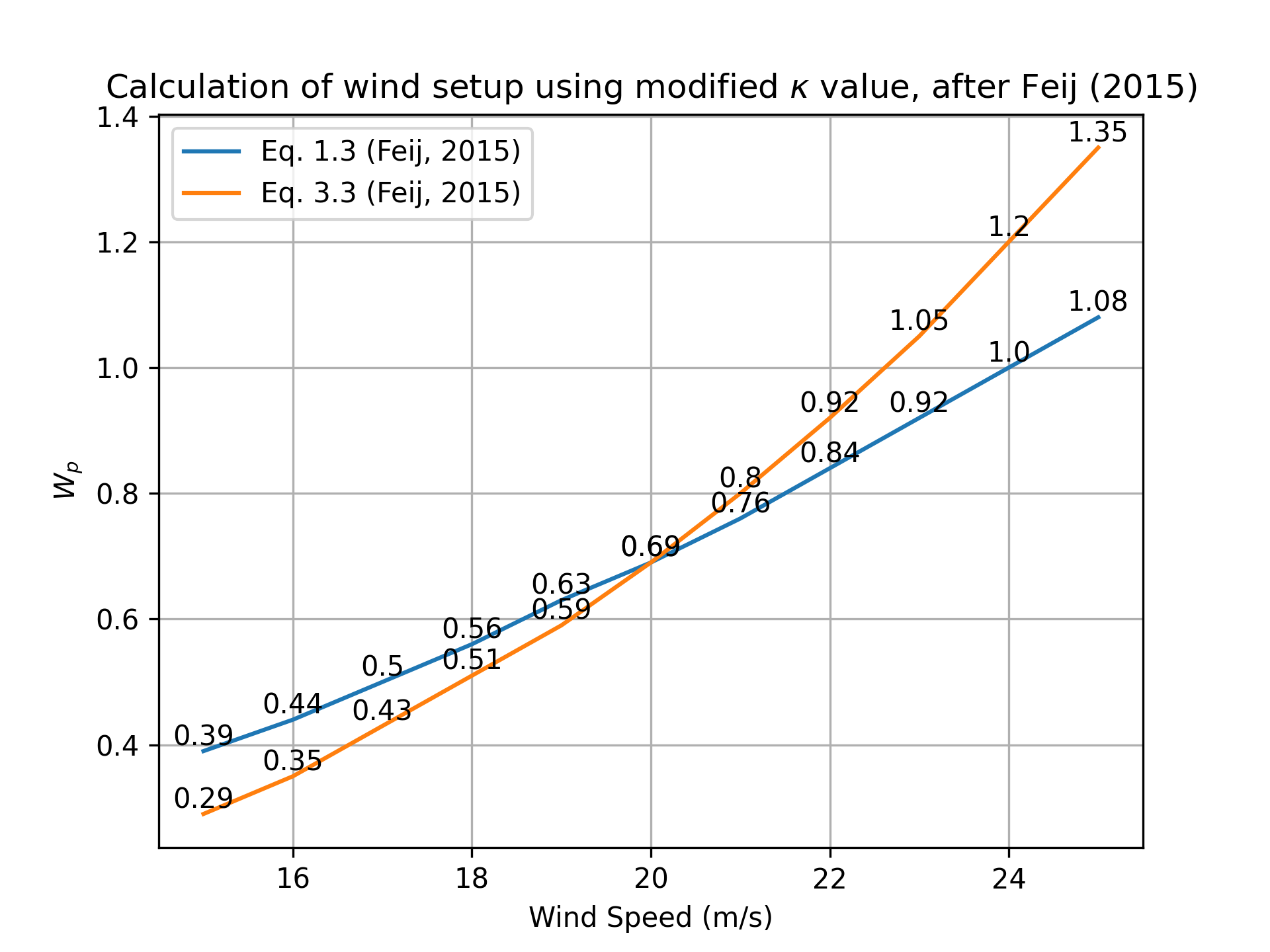
Graph showing result of using modified value κ=1.7*10-7 for the calculation of wind setup, after Feij (2015).

To calculate the wind setup in a lake, the following solution for the differential equation is used:

$$\Delta h= 0.5 \kappa \frac{u^2}{gh} F \cos \phi$$

In 1966 the Delta Works Committee recommended using a value of 3.8*10^{−6} for $\kappa$ under Dutch conditions. However, an analysis of measurement data from the IJsselmeer between 2002 and 2013 led to a more reliable value for $\kappa$, specifically $\kappa$ = 2.2*10^{−6}.

This study also found that the formula underestimated wind setup at higher wind speeds. As a result, it has been suggested to increase the exponent of the wind speed from 2 to 3 and to further adjust $\kappa$ to $\kappa$=1.7*10^{−7}. This modified formula can predict the wind setup on the IJsselmeer with an accuracy of approximately 15 centimetres.

For confined environments such as marshes or small fetches, a simplified empirical model for wind setup has been proposed by Algra et al (2023). This model was designed to estimate wind setup in the Suisun Marsh, where fetch lengths are smaller and shallow water depth conditions apply. The equation is expressed as:

$$\delta h = \kappa \frac{u_{10}^2}{g \cdot h} \cdot F \cdot \cos(\phi)$$

Where:

- $\delta h$ = wind setup (water level rise),
- $\kappa$ = constant (typically derived empirically),
- $u_{10}$ = wind speed measured 10 metres above the water surface,
- $g$ = gravitational constant,
- $h$ = average water depth,
- $F$ = fetch length,
- $\phi$ = angle between wind direction and the fetch.

This equation assumes that the fetch is small and simplifies the wind setup process by making the wind setup linearly proportional to the square of the wind speed. In their 2023 analysis of Van Sickle Island, Algra et al. found this model effective for environments with limited fetch and shallow depth, where the more complex approaches used for open coasts are unnecessary. Unlike the more detailed differential equation formulations used for larger open coasts or lakes, the Van Sickle model provides a practical approximation for confined areas where wind setup may still be significant but where spatial constraints simplify the overall water movement dynamics.

== Note ==
Wind setup should not be mistaken for wave run-up, which refers to the height which a wave reaches on a slope, or wave setup which is the increase in water level caused by breaking waves.

== See also ==
- Storm surge
- Coastal flooding
- Coastal engineering
