= Jurjen Battjes =

Dutch civil engineer (born 1939)

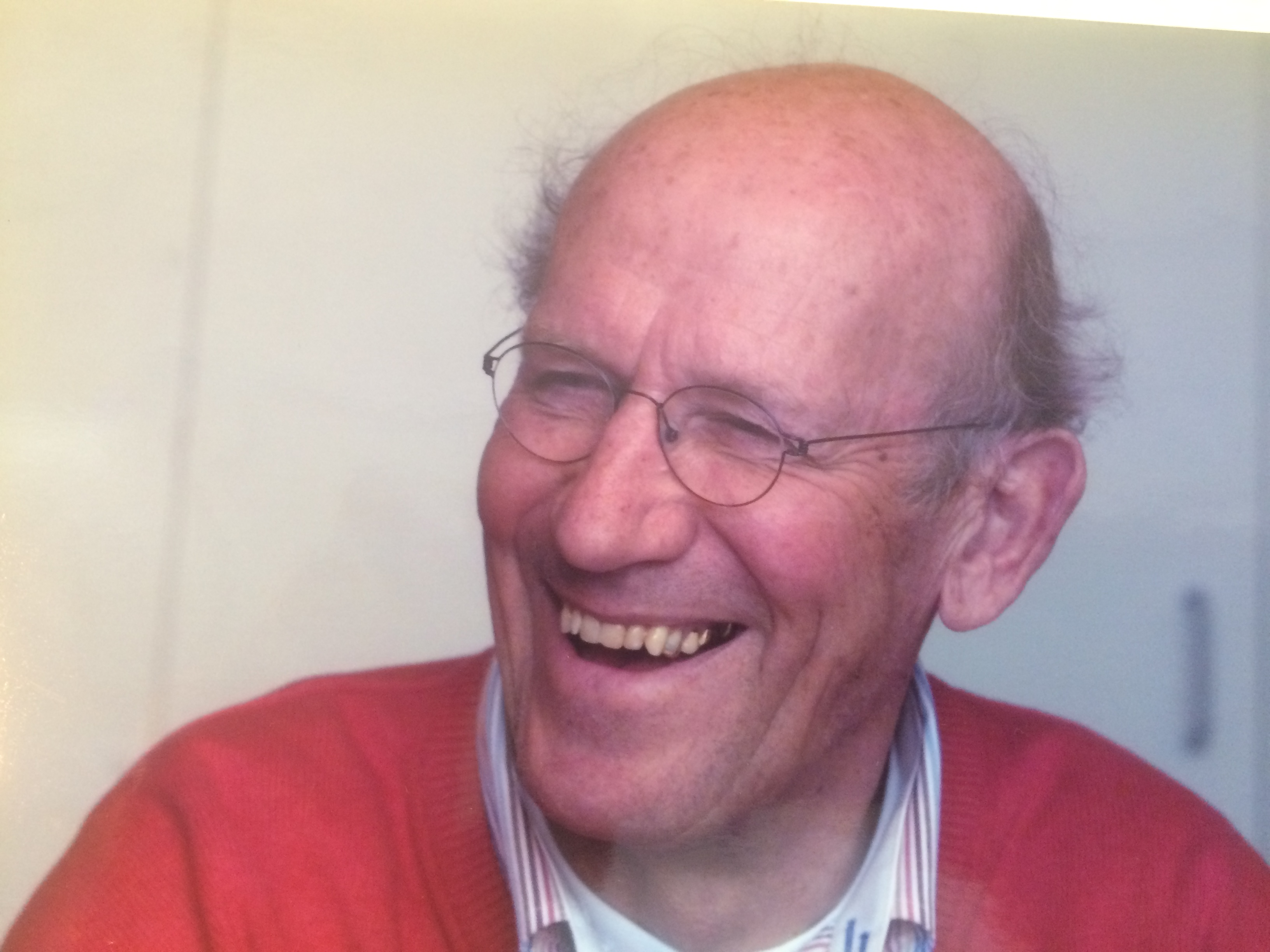
- Born: 22 February 1939 (age 87); Winschoten, Netherlands
- Education: Delft University of Technology
- Occupation: professor in Fluid Mechanics at Delft University of Technology

Jurjen Anno Battjes (born 22 February 1939) is a Dutch civil engineer. He was a professor of fluid dynamics at Delft University of Technology until his retirement in 2004.

Battjes was elected an international member of the National Academy of Engineering in 2009 for international leadership, research, and teaching in coastal engineering and storm protection.

== Career ==
Battjes was born on 22 February 1939 in Winschoten. He studied civil engineering at Delft University of Technology, earning his M.Sc in 1962. Battjes subsequently spent four years as an assistant professor at the Laboratory of Coastal Engineering at the University of Florida, in the United States. He started working as a professor at Delft University of Technology in the late 1960s, where he held the chair of fluid dynamics. In 1974 Battjes obtained his Doctor title in technical sciences at Delft University under Johan Schönfeld, with a thesis titled Computation of Set-up, Longshore Currents, Run-up and Overtopping due to Wind-generated Waves. Battjes retired in 2004.

In October 2005 Battjes was hired to help analyse the causes of the 2005 levee failures in Greater New Orleans that were caused by Hurricane Katrina. Battjes was member of the External Review Panel, charged with checking the work of the taskforce investigating the functioning of levees in Greater New Orleans. He was the only non-American on this panel.

Battjes became a member of the Royal Netherlands Academy of Arts and Sciences in 1975. In 1990, he won the International Coastal Engineering Award of the American Society of Civil Engineers. In 2009, Battjes was elected as a foreign member of the United States National Academy of Engineering in the section of civil engineering.

His book Unsteady flows in open channels, co-authored with Robert Jan Labeur, was selected as one of the "outstanding academic titles 2017" by Choice magazine.

== Works ==
- Battjes, J.A.; Labeur, R.J. (2017). Unsteady flow in open channels. Cambridge University Press. doi:10.1017/9781316576878. ISBN 978-1-107-15029-4.
- Battjes, J.A. (2002). "Een reus in de waterbouwkunde, biografie van prof. dr.ir. J.Th. Thijsse". Delfts Goud, leven en werken van achttien markante hoogleraren. Delft.
