= Breaking wave =

Unstable wave

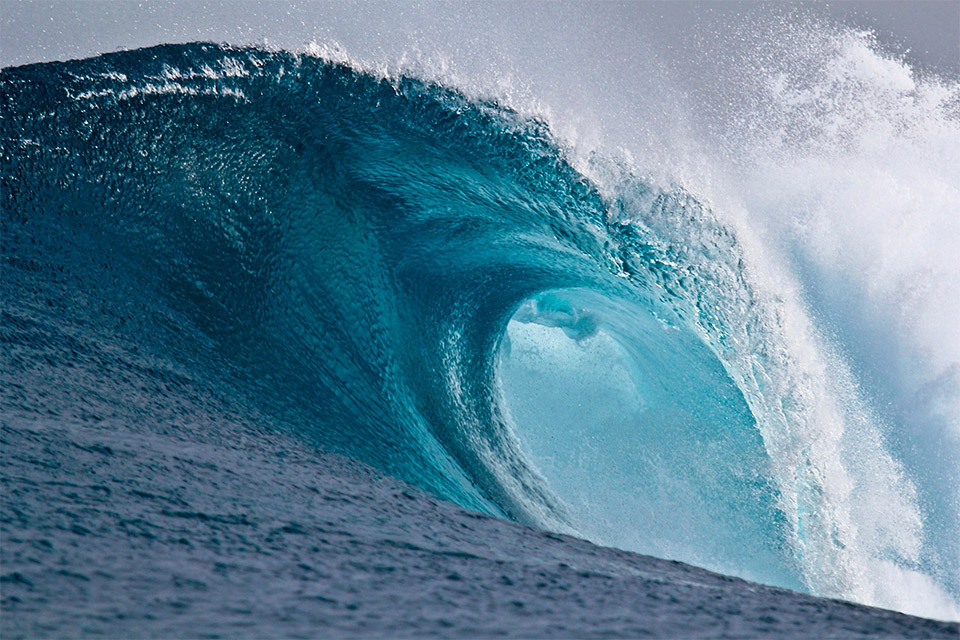
Plunging breaker

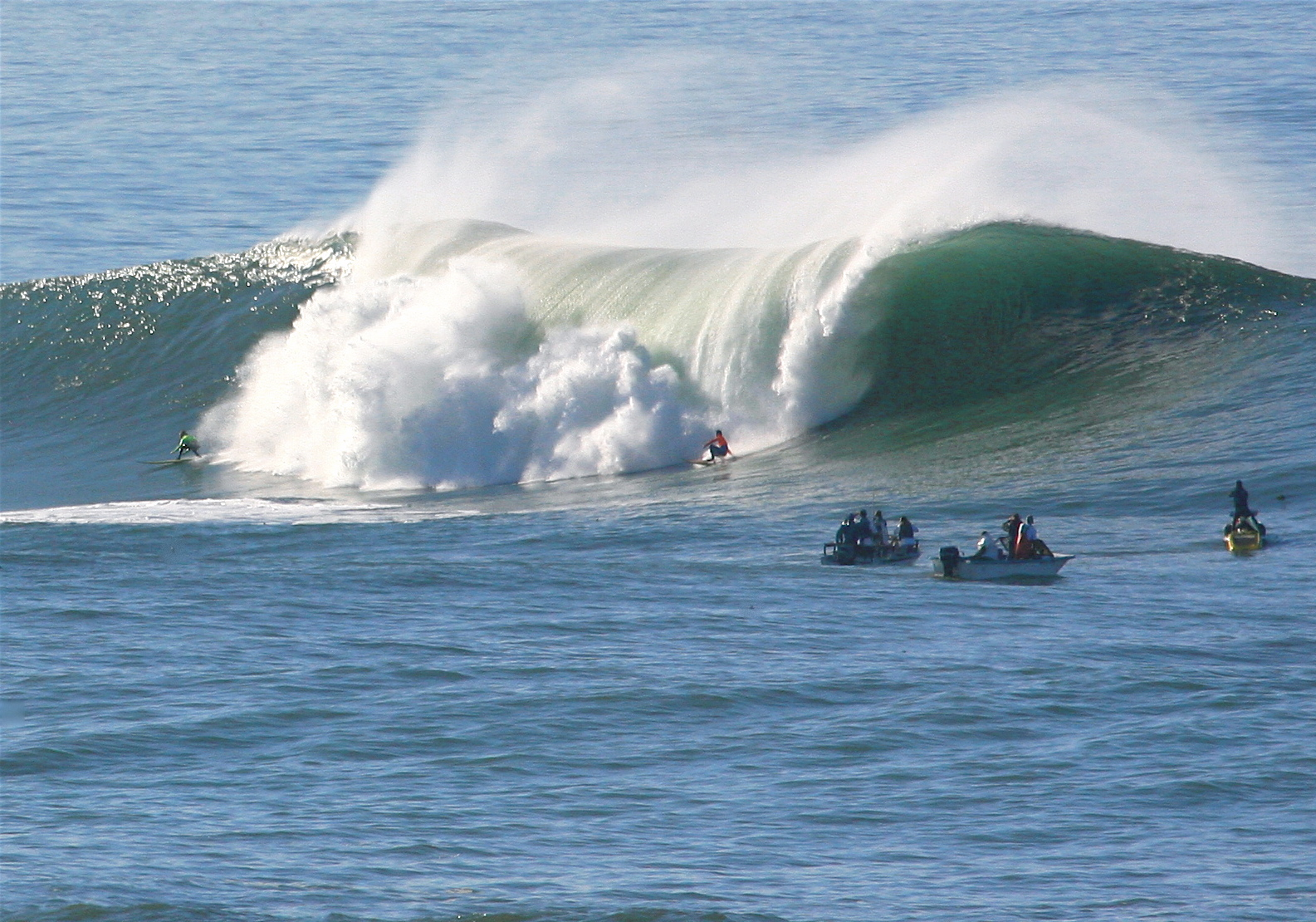
Large wave breaking

In fluid dynamics and nautical terminology, a break or breaker is a wave with enough energy to "break" at its peak, reaching a critical level at which linear energy transforms into wave turbulence energy with a distinct forward curve. At this point, simple physical models that describe wave dynamics often become invalid, particularly those that assume linear behaviour.

The most generally familiar sort of breaking wave is the breaking of water surface waves on a coastline. Wave breaking mostly occur when the amplitude reaches the point that the crest of the wave actually overturns. Certain other effects in fluid dynamics have also been termed "breaking waves", partly by analogy with water surface waves. In meteorology, atmospheric gravity waves are said to break when the wave produces regions where the potential temperature decreases with height, leading to energy dissipation through convective instability; likewise, Rossby waves are said to break when the potential vorticity gradient is overturned. Wave breaking also occurs in plasmas, when the particle velocities exceed the wave's phase speed. Another application in plasma physics is plasma expansion into a vacuum, in which the process of wave breaking and the subsequent development of a fast ion peak is described by the Sack-Schamel equation.

A reef or spot of shallow water such as a shoal against which waves break may also be known as a breaker.

== Types ==
Classification of breaking wave types

Breaking wave on a slope in a laboratory wave channel (movie)

Animation showing how the slope of the seafloor along the coast affects breaking waves

Breaking of water surface waves may occur anywhere that the amplitude is sufficient, including in mid-ocean. However, it is particularly common on beaches, because wave heights are amplified in the region of shallower water because the group velocity is lower there.

There are four basic types of breaking water waves. They are spilling, plunging, collapsing, and surging.

=== Spilling breakers ===
When the ocean floor has a gradual slope, the wave will steepen until the crest becomes unstable, resulting in turbulent whitewater spilling down the face of the wave. This continues as the wave approaches the shore, and the wave's energy is slowly dissipated in the whitewater. Because of this, spilling waves break for a longer time than other waves, and create a relatively gentle wave. Onshore wind conditions make spillers more likely.

=== Plunging breakers ===
A plunging wave occurs when the ocean floor is steep or has sudden depth changes, such as from a reef or sandbar. The crest of the wave becomes much steeper than a spilling wave, becomes vertical, then curls over and drops onto the trough of the wave, releasing most of its energy at once in a relatively violent impact. A plunging wave breaks with more energy than a significantly larger spilling wave. The wave can trap and compress the air under the lip, which creates the "crashing" sound associated with waves. With large waves, this crash can be felt by beachgoers on land. Offshore wind conditions can make plungers more likely.

If a plunging wave is not parallel to the beach (or the ocean floor), the section of the wave which reaches shallow water will break first, and the breaking section (or curl) will move laterally across the face of the wave as the wave continues. This is the "tube" that is so highly sought after by surfers (also called a "barrel", a "pit", and "the greenroom", among other terms). The surfer tries to stay near or under the crashing lip, often trying to stay as "deep" in the tube as possible while still being able to shoot forward and exit the barrel before it closes. A plunging wave that is parallel to the beach can break along its whole length at once, rendering it unrideable and dangerous. Surfers refer to these waves as "closed out".

=== Collapsing ===
Collapsing waves are a cross between plunging and surging, in which the crest never fully breaks, yet the bottom face of the wave gets steeper and collapses, resulting in foam.

=== Surging ===
Surging breakers originate from long period, low steepness waves and/or steep beach profiles. The outcome is the rapid movement of the base of the wave up the swash slope and the disappearance of the wave crest. The front face and crest of the wave remain relatively smooth with little foam or bubbles, resulting in a very narrow surf zone, or no breaking waves at all. The short, sharp burst of wave energy means that the swash/backwash cycle completes before the arrival of the next wave, leading to a low value of Kemp's phase difference (< 0.5). Surging waves are typical of reflective beach states. On steeper beaches, the energy of the wave can be reflected by the bottom back into the ocean, causing standing waves.

== Physics ==
Spilling breaker

Plunging breaker

Collapsing breaker

Surging breaker

Different breaking-wave types, drawn after photos from a lab experiment, can be associated with the value of the Iribarren number.

As ocean surface waves enter shallow water, the water particle velocities begin to move faster relative to the speed of the waveform. As a result, the waveform becomes unstable and the crest of the wave overturns, which is known as the wave breaking process. During breaking, a deformation (usually a bulge) forms at the wave crest, either leading side of which is known as the "toe". Parasitic capillary waves are formed, with short wavelengths. Those above the "toe" tend to have much longer wavelengths. This theory is anything but perfect, however, as it is linear. There have been a couple non-linear theories of motion (regarding waves). One put forth uses a perturbation method to expand the description all the way to the third order, and better solutions have been found since then. As for wave deformation, methods much like the boundary integral method and the Boussinesq model have been created.

It has been found that high-frequency detail present in a breaking wave plays a part in crest deformation and destabilization. The same theory expands on this, stating that the valleys of the capillary waves create a source for vorticity. It is said that surface tension (and viscosity) are significant for waves up to about 7 cm (3 in) in wavelength.

These models are flawed, however, as they cannot take into account what happens to the water after the wave breaks. Experiments have been conducted to deduce the evolution of turbulence after break, both in deep water and on a beach.

After the tip of the wave overturns and the jet collapses, it creates a very coherent and defined horizontal vortex. The plunging breakers create secondary eddies down the face of the wave. Small horizontal random eddies that form on the sides of the wave suggest that, perhaps, prior to breaking, the water's velocity is more or less two dimensional. This becomes three dimensional upon breaking.

The main vortex along the front of the wave diffuses rapidly into the interior of the wave after breaking, as the eddies on the surface become more viscous. Advection and molecular diffusion play a part in stretching the vortex and redistributing the vorticity, as well as the formation turbulence cascades. The energy of the large vortices are, by this method, transferred to much smaller isotropic vortices.

A theoretical limit on the steepness of non-breaking waves in finite depth is given by the Miche criterion, derived by French engineer Robert Miche in 1944.

== See also ==
- Iribarren number – Dimensionless parameter
- Wave turbulence – Set of nonlinear waves deviated far from thermal equilibrium
