= Wave shoaling =

Effect by which surface waves entering shallower water change in wave height

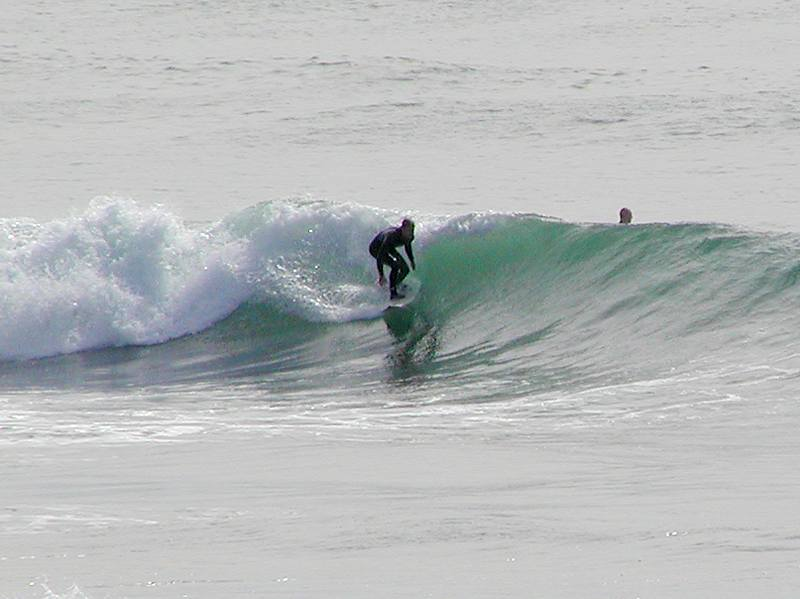
Surfing on shoaling and breaking waves.

The phase velocity c_{p} (blue) and group velocity c_{g} (red) as a function of water depth h for surface gravity waves of constant frequency, according to Airy wave theory. Quantities have been made dimensionless using the gravitational acceleration g and period T, with the deep-water wavelength given by L_{0} = gT^{2}/(2π) and the deep-water phase speed c_{0} = L_{0}/T. The grey line corresponds with the shallow-water limit c_{p} =c_{g} = √(gh). The phase speed – and thus also the wavelength L = c_{p}T – decreases monotonically with decreasing depth. However, the group velocity first increases by 20% with respect to its deep-water value (of c_{g} = 1/2c_{0} = gT/(4π)) before decreasing in shallower depths.

In fluid dynamics, wave shoaling is the effect by which surface waves, entering shallower water, increase in wave height. It is caused by the fact that the group velocity, which is also the wave-energy transport velocity, decreases with water depth. Under stationary conditions, a decrease in transport speed must be compensated by an increase in energy density in order to maintain a constant energy flux. Shoaling waves will also exhibit a reduction in wavelength while the frequency remains constant.

In other words, as the waves approach the shore and the water gets shallower, the waves get taller, slow down, and get closer together.

Particularly in a waterbody shallow enough for its surface to be affected by its bottom and where depth contours parallel the shore, a wave packet that does dissipate its energy by breaking will rise in height as it enters yet shallower water. This is plainly evident for tsunamis as they wax in height when approaching a coastline, often with devastating results.

== Overview ==
Waves nearing the coast experience changes in wave height through different effects. Some of the important wave processes are refraction, diffraction, reflection, wave breaking, wave–current interaction, friction, wave growth due to the wind, and wave shoaling. In the absence of the other effects, wave shoaling is the change of wave height that occurs solely by changes in mean water depth – without alterations in wave propagation direction or energy dissipation. Pure wave shoaling occurs for long-crested waves propagating perpendicular to the parallel depth contour lines of a mildly sloping sea-bed. Then the wave height $H$ at a certain location can be expressed as:

$$H = K_S\; H_0,$$

with $K_S$ the shoaling coefficient and $H_0$ the wave height in deep water. The shoaling coefficient $K_S$ depends on the local water depth $h$ and the wave frequency $f$ (or equivalently on $h$ and the wave period $T=1/f$). Deep water means that the waves are (hardly) affected by the sea bed, which occurs when the depth $h$ is larger than about half the deep-water wavelength $L_0=gT^2/(2\pi).$

== Physics ==
When waves enter shallow water they slow down. Under stationary conditions, the wave length is reduced. The energy flux must remain constant and the reduction in group (transport) speed is compensated by an increase in wave height (and thus wave energy density).

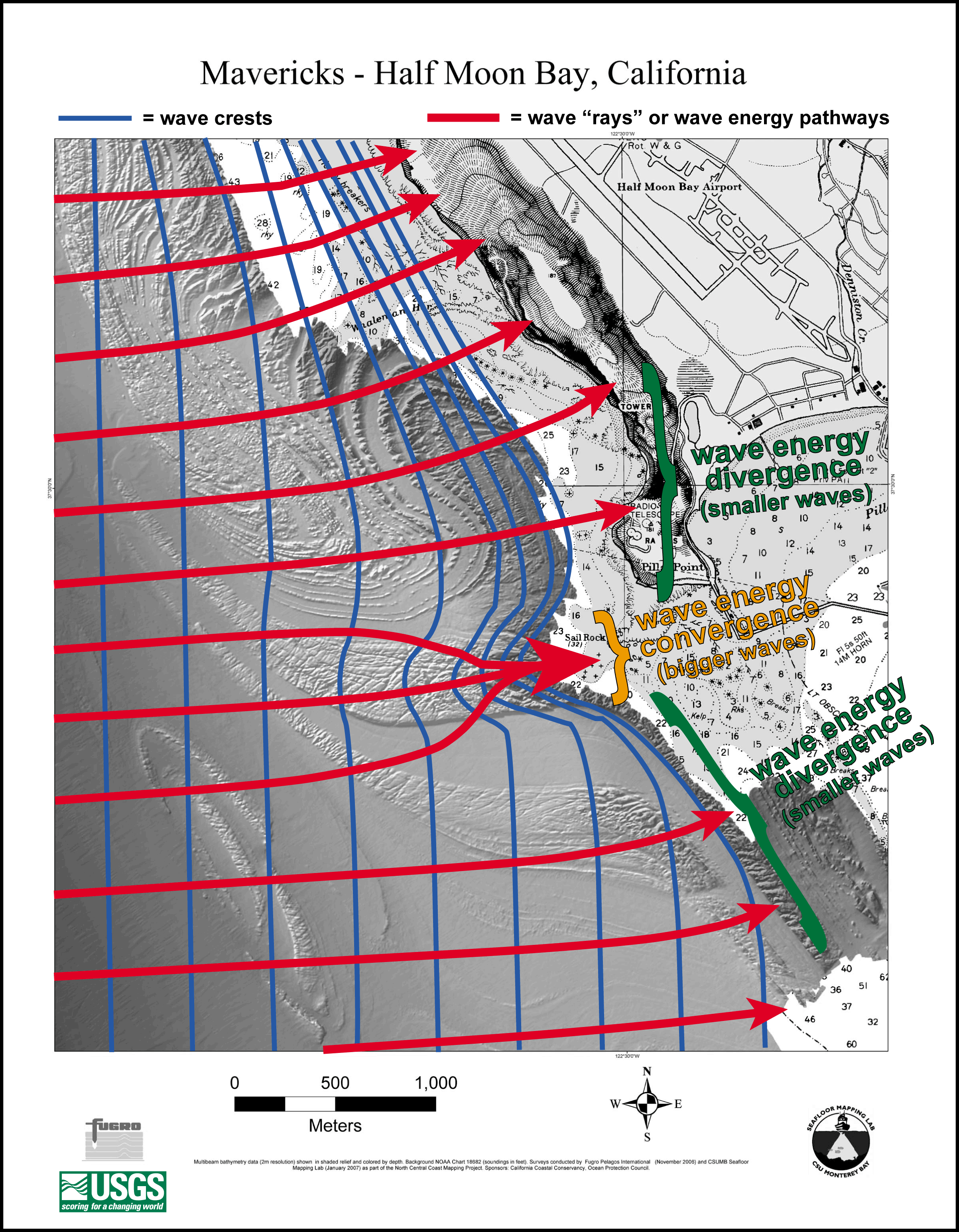
Convergence of wave rays (reduction of width $b$) at Mavericks, California, producing high surfing waves. The red lines are the wave rays; the blue lines are the wavefronts. The distances between neighboring wave rays vary towards the coast because of refraction by bathymetry (depth variations). The distance between wavefronts (i.e. the wavelength) reduces towards the coast because of the decreasing phase speed.

Shoaling coefficient $K_S$ as a function of relative water depth $h/L_0,$ describing the effect of wave shoaling on the wave height – based on conservation of energy and results from Airy wave theory. The local wave height $H$ at a certain mean water depth $h$ is equal to $H=K_S\;H_0,$ with $H_0$ the wave height in deep water (i.e. when the water depth is greater than about half the wavelength). The shoaling coefficient $K_S$ depends on $h/L_0,$ where $L_0$ is the wavelength in deep water: $L_0=gT^2/(2\pi),$ with $T$ the wave period and $g$ the gravity of Earth. The blue line is the shoaling coefficient according to Green's law for waves in shallow water, i.e. valid when the water depth is less than 1/20 times the local wavelength $L=T\,\sqrt{gh}.$

For non-breaking waves, the energy flux associated with the wave motion, which is the product of the wave energy density with the group velocity, between two wave rays is a conserved quantity (i.e. a constant when following the energy of a wave packet from one location to another). Under stationary conditions the total energy transport must be constant along the wave ray – as first shown by William Burnside in 1915. For waves affected by refraction and shoaling (i.e. within the geometric optics approximation), the rate of change of the wave energy transport is:

$$\frac{d}{ds}(b c_g E) = 0,$$

where $s$ is the co-ordinate along the wave ray and $b c_g E$ is the energy flux per unit crest length. A decrease in group speed $c_g$ and distance between the wave rays $b$ must be compensated by an increase in energy density $E$. This can be formulated as a shoaling coefficient relative to the wave height in deep water.

For shallow water, when the wavelength is much larger than the water depth – in the case of a constant ray distance $b$ (i.e. perpendicular wave incidence on a coast with parallel depth contours) – wave shoaling satisfies Green's law:

$$H\, \sqrt[4]{h} = \text{constant},$$

with $h$ the mean water depth, $H$ the wave height and $\sqrt[4]{h}$ the fourth root of $h.$

== Water wave refraction ==
Following Phillips (1977) and Mei (1989), denote the phase of a wave ray as

$$S = S(\mathbf{x},t), \qquad 0\leq S<2\pi$$.

The local wave number vector is the gradient of the phase function,

$$\mathbf{k} = \nabla S$$,

and the angular frequency is proportional to its local rate of change,

$$\omega = -\partial S/\partial t$$.

The equations above and the following equation have direct analogues in Hamiltonian mechanics and the Hamilton-Jacobi theory of classical mechanics. Simplifying to one dimension and cross-differentiating it is now easily seen that the above definitions indicate simply that the rate of change of wavenumber is balanced by the convergence of the frequency along a ray;

$$\frac{\partial k}{\partial t} + \frac{\partial \omega}{\partial x} = 0$$.

Assuming stationary conditions ($\partial/\partial t = 0$), this implies that wave crests are conserved and the frequency must remain constant along a wave ray as $\partial \omega / \partial x = 0$. As waves enter shallower waters, the decrease in group velocity caused by the reduction in water depth leads to a reduction in wave length $\lambda = 2\pi/k$ because the nondispersive shallow water limit of the dispersion relation for the wave phase speed,

$$\omega/k \equiv c = \sqrt{gh}$$

dictates that

$$k = \omega/\sqrt{gh}$$,

i.e., a steady increase in k (decrease in $\lambda$) as the phase speed decreases under constant $\omega$.

== See also ==
- Airy wave theory – Fluid dynamics theory on gravity waves
- Wave action (continuum mechanics) – Conservable measure of the wave part of a motion
- Breaking wave – Unstable wave
- Dispersion (water waves) – Dispersion of waves on a water surface
- Ocean surface waves – Surface waves generated by wind on open water
- Shallow water equations – Set of partial differential equations on fluid flow
- Shoal – Natural submerged sandbank that rises from a body of water to near the surface
- Waves and shallow water – Effect of shallow water on a surface gravity wave
- Wave height – Difference between the elevations of a crest and a neighbouring trough
- Ursell number – Number used in fluid mechanics
