= Philip Kelland =

British mathematician

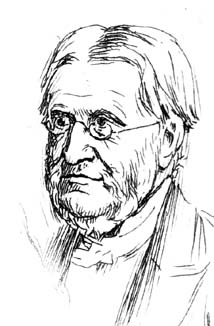
- Kelland, circa 1870
- Born: 17 October 1808; Dunster, Somerset, England
- Died: 8 May 1879 (aged 70); Allen, Stirlingshire, Scotland
- Citizenship: United Kingdom of Great Britain and Ireland
- Education: Queens' College, Cambridge
- Known for: Research on water waves Development of education in Scotland
- Awards: Smith's Prize (1834); Keith Prize (1849–51)
- Scientific career
- Fields: Mathematician
- Workplaces: University of Edinburgh
- Academic advisors: William Hopkins

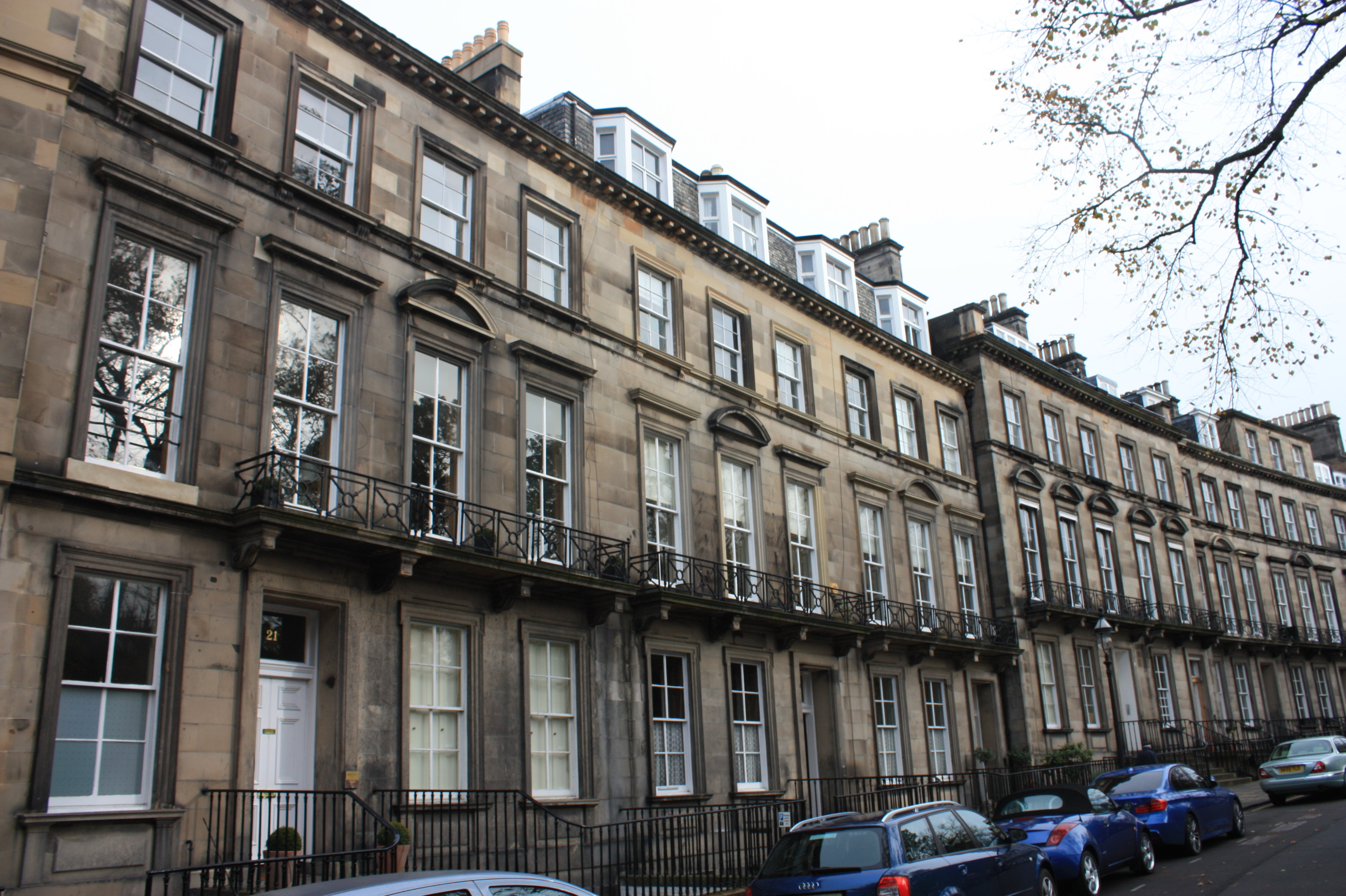
Kelland's house at 20 Clarendon Crescent, Edinburgh (centre)

Philip Kelland PRSE FRS (17 October 1808 – 8 May 1879) was an English pastor and mathematician. He was known mainly for his great influence on the development of education in Scotland.

== Life ==
Kelland was born in 1808 the son of Philip Kelland (d.1847), curate in Dunster, Somerset, England. He was educated at Sherborne, and was an undergraduate at Queens' College, Cambridge, where he was tutored privately by English mathematician William Hopkins and graduated in 1834 as senior wrangler and first Smith's prizeman. He was ordained in the Church of England. From 1834 to 1838, he was a fellow of Queens' College, Cambridge.

Kelland was elected Fellow of the Royal Society in 1838 and Fellow of the Royal Society of Edinburgh in 1839. He served as Secretary of the RSE 1843–4, Vice-president 1857–77 and President 1878–9. He won their Keith Medal for the period 1849–51.

He lived his final years at 20 Clarendon Crescent in western Edinburgh.

Kelland is buried in Warriston Cemetery in the north of the city.

== Academic career ==
Kelland was appointed Professor of Mathematics at the University of Edinburgh in 1838. He was a successor to Scottish mathematician William Wallace. He became the first English-born and wholly English-educated mathematician to hold that chair.

Kelland joined with Scottish physicist James David Forbes in supporting reforms of the Scottish university system. He was an efficient education reformer. He won the respect of his colleagues, and was regarded highly as a mathematics instructor. He wrote on the reform of the Scottish universities.

== Research ==
Kelland's early research work, undertaken at the University of Cambridge, was influenced by mathematicians Joseph Fourier and Augustin Louis Cauchy. This research is described in his Theory of Heat (1837, 1842) and in some papers. However, this proved not to be based on sound principles.

In all, 28 papers published by Kelland, mainly on heat, light and water waves, are listed in the Royal Society Catalogue of Scientific Papers. His theoretical work on water waves (1840, 1844), published in Transactions of the Royal Society of Edinburgh, tried to explain aspects of the important experiments of John Scott Russell, then being carried out near Edinburgh. Although this work was flawed in some respects, it anticipated some of the results later obtained by George Biddell Airy and George Gabriel Stokes.

Kelland wrote analytical papers on General Differentiation in 1839, and Differential Equations in 1853. He gave a geometrical Theory of Parallels outlining a version of non-Euclidean geometry. He wrote mathematics books and edited works of mathematician John Playfair and polymath Thomas Young.

== Family ==
He married twice: firstly to "Miss Pilkington" secondly to Miss Boswall of Wardie.

== See also ==
- Airy wave theory
- Dispersion (water waves)
