= Dispersion (water waves) =

Dispersion of waves on a water surface

In fluid dynamics, dispersion of water waves generally refers to frequency dispersion, which means that waves of different wavelengths travel at different phase speeds. Water waves, in this context, are waves propagating on the water surface, with gravity and surface tension as the restoring forces. As a result, water with a free surface is generally considered to be a dispersive medium.

For a certain water depth, surface gravity waves – i.e. waves occurring at the air–water interface and gravity as the only force restoring it to flatness – propagate faster with increasing wavelength. On the other hand, for a given (fixed) wavelength, gravity waves in deeper water have a larger phase speed than in shallower water. In contrast with the behavior of gravity waves, capillary waves (i.e. only forced by surface tension) propagate faster for shorter wavelengths.

Besides frequency dispersion, water waves also exhibit amplitude dispersion. This is a nonlinear effect, by which waves of larger amplitude have a different phase speed from small-amplitude waves.

Kelvin waves are non-dispersive gravity waves which occur in water; they have the same phase velocity and group velocity.

== Frequency dispersion for surface gravity waves ==
This section is about frequency dispersion for waves on a fluid layer forced by gravity, and according to linear theory. For surface tension effects on frequency dispersion, see surface tension effects in Airy wave theory and capillary wave.

=== Wave propagation and dispersion ===
Sinusoidal wave.

The simplest propagating wave of unchanging form is a sine wave. A sine wave with water surface elevation $\eta(x,t)$ is given by:

$$\eta(x,t) = a \sin \left( \theta(x,t) \right),\,$$

where a is the amplitude (in metres) and $\theta=\theta(x,t)$ is the phase function (in radians), depending on the horizontal position (x, in metres) and time (t, in seconds):

$\theta = 2\pi \left( \frac{x}{\lambda} - \frac{t}{T} \right) = k x - \omega t,$ with $k = \frac{2\pi}{\lambda}$ and $\omega = \frac{2\pi}{T},$

where:

- λ is the wavelength (in metres),
- T is the period (in seconds),
- k is the wavenumber (in radians per metre) and
- ω is the angular frequency (in radians per second).

Characteristic phases of a water wave are:

- the upward zero-crossing at θ = 0,
- the wave crest at θ = 1/2 π,
- the downward zero-crossing at θ = π and
- the wave trough at θ = 3/2 π.

A certain phase repeats itself after an integer m multiple of $2\pi$. $\sin(\theta)=\sin(\theta+2\pi m)$

Essential for water waves, and other wave phenomena in physics, is that free propagating waves of non-zero amplitude only exist when the angular frequency ω and wavenumber k (or equivalently the wavelength λ and period T) satisfy a functional relationship: the frequency dispersion relation

$$\omega^2 = \Omega^2(k).\,$$

The dispersion relation has two solutions: $\omega=+\Omega(k)$ and $\omega=-\Omega(k)$, corresponding to waves travelling in the positive or negative x–direction. The dispersion relation will in general depend on several other parameters in addition to the wavenumber k. For gravity waves, according to linear theory, these are the acceleration by gravity g and the water depth h. The dispersion relation for these waves is:

$\omega^2 = g\, k\, \tanh(k\,h)$ or $\displaystyle \lambda = \frac{g}{2\pi}\, T^2\, \tanh\left( 2\pi\, \frac{h}{\lambda} \right),$

an implicit equation with tanh denoting the hyperbolic tangent function.

An initial wave phase $\theta=\theta_0$ propagates as a function of space and time. Its subsequent position is given by:

$$x = \frac{\lambda}{T}\, t + \frac{\lambda}{2\pi}\, \theta_0 = \frac{\omega}{k}\, t + \frac{\theta_0}{k}.$$

This shows that the phase moves with the velocity:

$$c_p = \frac{\lambda}{T} = \frac{\omega}{k} = \frac{\Omega(k)}{k},$$

which is called the phase velocity.

=== Phase velocity ===
Dispersion of gravity waves on a fluid surface. Phase and group velocity divided by shallow-water phase velocity √gh as a function of relative depth h / λ. Blue lines (A): phase velocity; Red lines (B): group velocity; Black dashed line (C): phase and group velocity √gh valid in shallow water. Drawn lines: dispersion relation valid in arbitrary depth. Dashed lines (blue and red): deep water limits.

Dispersion of gravity waves on a fluid surface. Phase and group velocity divided by deep-water phase velocity √gλ / (2π) as a function of relative depth h / λ. Blue lines (A): phase velocity; Red lines (B): group velocity; Black dashed line (C): phase and group velocity √gh valid in shallow water. Drawn lines: dispersion relation valid in arbitrary depth. Dashed lines (blue and red): deep water limits.

A sinusoidal wave, of small surface-elevation amplitude and with a constant wavelength, propagates with the phase velocity, also called celerity or phase speed. While the phase velocity is a vector and has an associated direction, celerity or phase speed refer only to the magnitude of the phase velocity. According to linear theory for waves forced by gravity, the phase speed depends on the wavelength and the water depth. For a fixed water depth, long waves (with large wavelength) propagate faster than shorter waves.

In the left figure, it can be seen that shallow water waves, with wavelengths λ much larger than the water depth h, travel with the phase velocity

$$c_p = \sqrt{gh} \qquad \scriptstyle \text{(shallow water)}\,$$

with g the acceleration by gravity and c_{p} the phase speed. Since this shallow-water phase speed is independent of the wavelength, shallow water waves do not have frequency dispersion.

Using another normalization for the same frequency dispersion relation, the figure on the right shows that for a fixed wavelength λ the phase speed c_{p} increases with increasing water depth. Until, in deep water with water depth h larger than half the wavelength λ (so for h/λ > 0.5), the phase velocity c_{p} is independent of the water depth:

$$c_p = \sqrt{\frac{g\lambda}{2\pi}} = \frac{g}{2\pi} T \qquad \scriptstyle \text{(deep water),}$$

with T the wave period (the reciprocal of the frequency f, T=1/f ). So in deep water the phase speed increases with the wavelength, and with the period.

Since the phase speed satisfies c_{p} = λ/T = λf, wavelength and period (or frequency) are related. For instance in deep water:

$$\lambda = \frac{g}{2\pi}T^2 \qquad \scriptstyle \text{(deep water).}$$

The dispersion characteristics for intermediate depth are given below.

=== Group velocity ===
Frequency dispersion in bichromatic groups of gravity waves on the surface of deep water. The red square moves with the phase velocity, and the green circles propagate with the group velocity. More ... In this deep-water case, the phase velocity is twice the group velocity. The red square overtakes two green circles, when moving from the left to the right of the figure. New waves seem to emerge at the back of a wave group, grow in amplitude until they are at the center of the group, and vanish at the wave group front. For gravity surface-waves, the water particle velocities are much smaller than the phase velocity, in most cases.

Interference of two sinusoidal waves with slightly different wavelengths, but the same amplitude and propagation direction, results in a beat pattern, called a wave group. As can be seen in the animation, the group moves with a group velocity c_{g} different from the phase velocity c_{p}, due to frequency dispersion.

The group velocity is depicted by the red lines (marked B) in the two figures above. In shallow water, the group velocity is equal to the shallow-water phase velocity. This is because shallow water waves are not dispersive. In deep water, the group velocity is equal to half the phase velocity: $c_g=\frac{1}{2}c_p$.

The group velocity also turns out to be the energy transport velocity. This is the velocity with which the mean wave energy is transported horizontally in a narrow-band wave field.

In the case of a group velocity different from the phase velocity, a consequence is that the number of waves counted in a wave group is different when counted from a snapshot in space at a certain moment, from when counted in time from the measured surface elevation at a fixed position. Consider a wave group of length Λ_{g} and group duration of τ_{g}. The group velocity is:

$$c_g = \frac{\Lambda_g}{\tau_g}.$$

The number of waves per group as observed in space at a certain moment (upper blue line), is different from the number of waves per group seen in time at a fixed position (lower orange line), due to frequency dispersion. More ... For the shown case, a bichromatic group of gravity waves on the surface of deep water, the group velocity is half the phase velocity. In this example, there are 5 3/4 waves between two wave group nodes in space, while there are 11 1/2 waves between two wave group nodes in time.

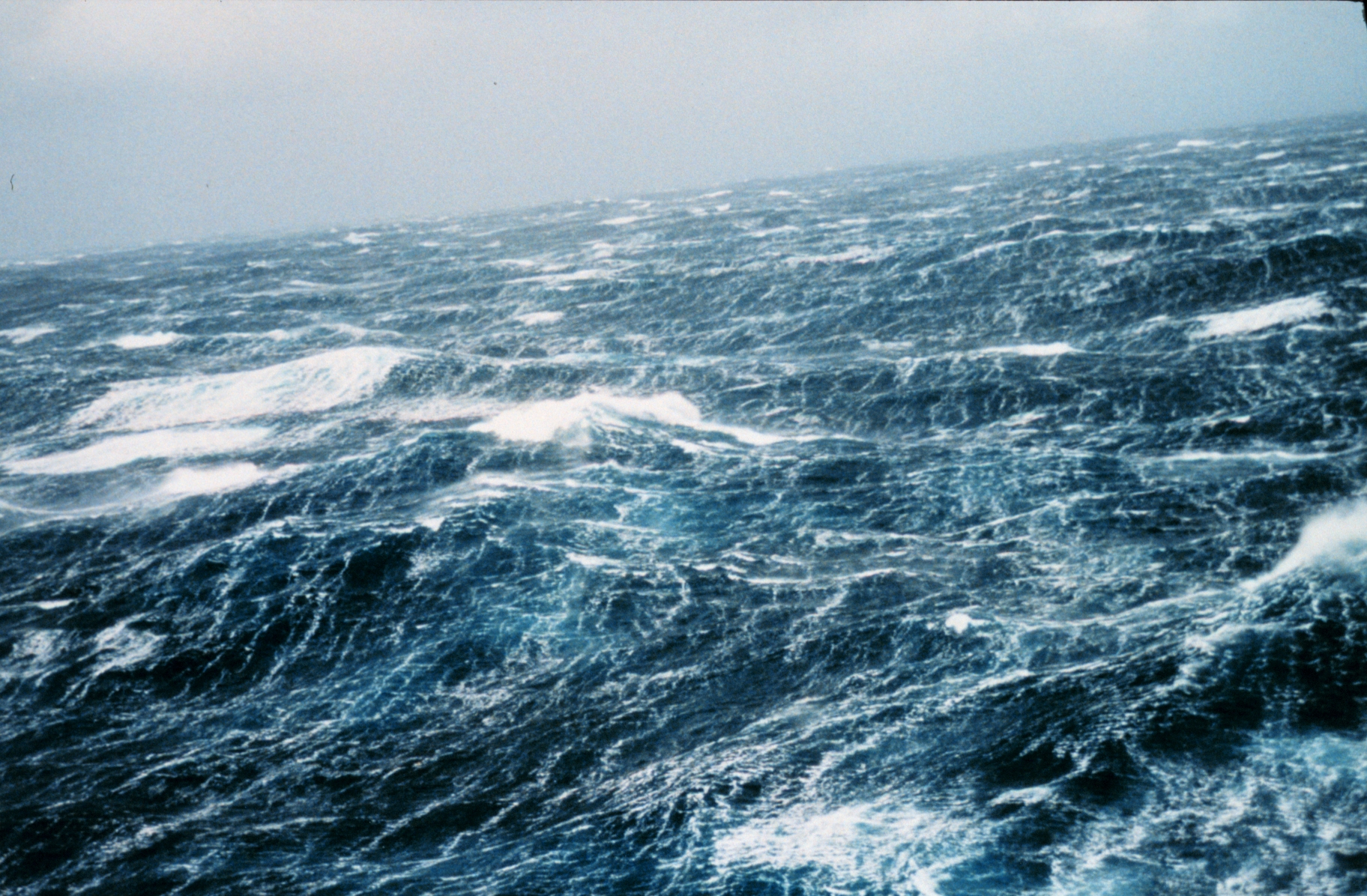
North Pacific storm waves as seen from the NOAA M/V Noble Star, Winter 1989.

The number of waves in a wave group, measured in space at a certain moment is: Λ_{g} / λ. While measured at a fixed location in time, the number of waves in a group is: τ_{g} / T. So the ratio of the number of waves measured in space to those measured in time is:

$$\tfrac{\text{No. of waves in space}}{\text{No. of waves in time}} =
\frac{\Lambda_g / \lambda}{\tau_g / T} =
\frac{\Lambda_g}{\tau_g} \cdot \frac{T}{\lambda} =
\frac{c_g}{c_p}.$$

So in deep water, with $c_g=\frac{1}{2}c_p$, a wave group has twice as many waves in time as it has in space.

The water surface elevation η(x,t), as a function of horizontal position x and time t, for a bichromatic wave group of full modulation can be mathematically formulated as:

$$\eta = a\, \sin \left( k_1 x - \omega_1 t \right)
+ a\, \sin \left( k_2 x - \omega_2 t \right),$$

with:

- a the wave amplitude of each frequency component in metres,
- k_{1} and k_{2} the wave number of each wave component, in radians per metre, and
- ω_{1} and ω_{2} the angular frequency of each wave component, in radians per second.

Both ω_{1} and k_{1}, as well as ω_{2} and k_{2}, have to satisfy the dispersion relation:

$\omega_1^2 = \Omega^2(k_1)\,$ and $\omega_2^2 = \Omega^2(k_2).\,$

Using trigonometric identities, the surface elevation is written as:

$$\eta= \left[ 2\, a\, \cos \left( \frac{k_1 - k_2}{2} x - \frac{\omega_1 - \omega_2}{2} t \right) \right]\;
\cdot\;
\sin \left( \frac{k_1 + k_2}{2} x - \frac{\omega_1 + \omega_2}{2} t \right).$$

The part between square brackets is the slowly varying amplitude of the group, with group wave number 1/2 ( k_{1} − k_{2} ) and group angular frequency 1/2 ( ω_{1} − ω_{2} ). As a result, the group velocity is, for the limit k_{1} → k_{2} :

$$c_g = \lim_{k_1\, \to\, k_2} \frac{\omega_1 - \omega_2}{k_1 - k_2}
= \lim_{k_1\, \to\, k_2} \frac{\Omega(k_1) - \Omega(k_2)}{k_1 - k_2}
= \frac{\text{d}\Omega(k)}{\text{d}k}.$$

Wave groups can only be discerned in case of a narrow-banded signal, with the wave-number difference k_{1} − k_{2} small compared to the mean wave number 1/2 (k_{1} + k_{2}).

=== Multi-component wave patterns ===
Frequency dispersion of surface gravity waves on deep water. The superposition (dark blue line) of three sinusoidal wave components (light blue lines) is shown. More ... For the three components respectively 22 (bottom), 25 (middle) and 29 (top) wavelengths fit in a horizontal domain of 2,000 meter length. The component with the shortest wavelength (top) propagates slowest. The wave amplitudes of the components are respectively 1, 2 and 1 meter. The differences in wavelength and phase speed of the components results in a changing pattern of wave groups, due to amplification where the components are in phase, and reduction where they are in anti-phase.

The effect of frequency dispersion is that the waves travel as a function of wavelength, so that spatial and temporal phase properties of the propagating wave are constantly changing. For example, under the action of gravity, water waves with a longer wavelength travel faster than those with a shorter wavelength.

While two superimposed sinusoidal waves, called a bichromatic wave, have an envelope which travels unchanged, three or more sinusoidal wave components result in a changing pattern of the waves and their envelope. A sea state – that is: real waves on the sea or ocean – can be described as a superposition of many sinusoidal waves with different wavelengths, amplitudes, initial phases and propagation directions. Each of these components travels with its own phase velocity, in accordance with the dispersion relation. The statistics of such a surface can be described by its power spectrum.

=== Dispersion relation ===
In the table below, the dispersion relation $\omega^2 = [\Omega(k)]^2$ between angular frequency ω = 2π / T and wave number k = 2π / λ is given, as well as the phase and group speeds.

Frequency dispersion of gravity waves on the surface of deep water, shallow water and at intermediate depth, according to linear wave theory
quantity	symbol	units	deep water $\left(h>\tfrac{1}{2}\lambda\right)$	shallow water $\left(h<\tfrac{1}{20}\lambda\right)$	intermediate depth (general formula valid for all $\lambda$ and $h$)
dispersion relation	$\displaystyle\Omega(k)$	rad / s	$\sqrt{gk}=\sqrt{\frac{2\pi\,g}{\lambda}}$	$k \sqrt{g h} = \frac{2\pi}{\lambda} \sqrt{g h}$	$$\begin{align} &\sqrt{ gk\, \tanh\left( kh \right)}\, \\[1.2ex] &=\sqrt{\frac{2\pi g}{\lambda}\tanh\left(\frac{2\pi h}{\lambda}\right)}\, \end{align}$$
phase velocity	$\displaystyle c_p=\frac{\lambda}{T}=\frac{\omega}{k}$	m / s	$\sqrt{\frac{g}{k}} = \frac{g}{\omega} = \frac{g}{2\pi} T$	$\sqrt{g h}$	$\sqrt{\frac{g}{k}\tanh\left( k h \right)}$
group velocity	$\displaystyle c_g= \frac{\partial\Omega}{\partial k}$	m / s	$\frac{1}{2}\sqrt{\frac{g}{k}} = \frac{1}{2}\frac{g}{\omega} = \frac{g}{4\pi} T$	$\sqrt{g h}$	$\frac{1}{2} c_p \left( 1 + \frac{2 k h}{\sinh\left(2 k h \right)} \right)$
ratio	$\displaystyle \frac{c_g}{c_p}$	-	$\displaystyle\frac{1}{2}$	$\displaystyle 1$	$\frac{1}{2} \left( 1 + \frac{2 k h}{\sinh\left( 2 k h \right)} \right)$
wavelength	$\displaystyle\lambda$	m	$\frac{g}{2\pi} T^2$	$T \sqrt{g h}$	for given period T, the solution of: $\displaystyle \left(\frac{2\pi}{T}\right)^2=\frac{2\pi g}{\lambda}\tanh\left(\frac{2\pi h}{\lambda}\right)$

Deep water corresponds with water depths larger than half the wavelength, which is the common situation in the ocean. In deep water, longer period waves propagate faster and transport their energy faster. The deep-water group velocity is half the phase velocity. In shallow water, for wavelengths larger than twenty times the water depth, as found quite often near the coast, the group velocity is equal to the phase velocity.

== History ==
The full linear dispersion relation was first found by Pierre-Simon Laplace, although there were some errors in his solution for the linear wave problem. The complete theory for linear water waves, including dispersion, was derived by George Biddell Airy and published in about 1840. A similar equation was also found by Philip Kelland at around the same time (but making some mistakes in his derivation of the wave theory).

The shallow water (with small h / λ) limit, ω^{2} = gh k^{2}, was derived by Joseph Louis Lagrange.

== Surface tension effects ==
Dispersion of gravity-capillary waves on the surface of deep water. Phase and group velocity divided by $\scriptstyle \sqrt[4]{g\sigma/\rho}$ as a function of inverse relative wavelength $\scriptstyle \frac{1}{\lambda}\sqrt{\sigma/(\rho g)}$. Blue lines (A): phase velocity, Red lines (B): group velocity. Drawn lines: dispersion relation for gravity-capillary waves. Dashed lines: dispersion relation for deep-water gravity waves. Dash-dot lines: dispersion relation valid for deep-water capillary waves.

In case of gravity–capillary waves, where surface tension affects the waves, the dispersion relation becomes:

$$\omega^2 = \left( g k + \frac{\sigma}{\rho} k^3 \right) \tanh (kh),$$

with σ the surface tension (in N/m).

For a water–air interface (with σ = 0.074 N/m and ρ = 1000 kg/m^{3}) the waves can be approximated as pure capillary waves – dominated by surface-tension effects – for wavelengths less than 0.4 cm (0.2 in). For wavelengths above 7 cm (3 in) the waves are to good approximation pure surface gravity waves with very little surface-tension effects.

== Interfacial waves ==
Wave motion on the interface between two layers of inviscid homogeneous fluids of different density, confined between horizontal rigid boundaries (at the top and bottom). The motion is forced by gravity. The upper layer has mean depth h and density ρ, while the lower layer has mean depth h and density ρ. The wave amplitude is a, the wavelength is denoted by λ.

For two homogeneous layers of fluids, of mean thickness h below the interface and h′ above – under the action of gravity and bounded above and below by horizontal rigid walls – the dispersion relationship ω^{2} = Ω^{2}(k) for gravity waves is provided by:

$$\Omega^2(k) = \frac{g\, k (\rho - \rho')}{\rho\, \coth( k h ) + \rho'\, \coth( k h')},$$

where again ρ and ρ′ are the densities below and above the interface, while coth is the hyperbolic cotangent function. For the case ρ′ is zero this reduces to the dispersion relation of surface gravity waves on water of finite depth h.

When the depth of the two fluid layers becomes very large (h→∞, h′→∞), the hyperbolic cotangents in the above formula approaches the value of one. Then:

$$\Omega^2(k) = \frac{\rho - \rho'}{\rho + \rho'}\, g\, k.$$

== Nonlinear effects ==
=== Shallow water ===
Amplitude dispersion effects appear for instance in the solitary wave: a single hump of water traveling with constant velocity in shallow water with a horizontal bed. Note that solitary waves are near-solitons, but not exactly – after the interaction of two (colliding or overtaking) solitary waves, they have changed a bit in amplitude and an oscillatory residual is left behind. The single soliton solution of the Korteweg–de Vries equation, of wave height H in water depth h far away from the wave crest, travels with the velocity:

$$c_p = c_g = \sqrt{g(h+H)}.$$

So for this nonlinear gravity wave it is the total water depth under the wave crest that determines the speed, with higher waves traveling faster than lower waves. Note that solitary wave solutions only exist for positive values of H, solitary gravity waves of depression do not exist.

=== Deep water ===
The linear dispersion relation – unaffected by wave amplitude – is for nonlinear waves also correct at the second order of the perturbation theory expansion, with the orders in terms of the wave steepness k a (where a is wave amplitude). To the third order, and for deep water, the dispersion relation is

$\omega^2 = gk \left[1+(ka)^2\right],$ so $c_p = \sqrt{\frac{g}{k}}\, \left[ 1 + \tfrac12\, (ka)^2 \right] + \mathcal{O}\left((ka)^4\right).$

This implies that large waves travel faster than small ones of the same frequency. This is only noticeable when the wave steepness k a is large.

== Waves on a mean current: Doppler shift ==
Water waves on a mean flow (so a wave in a moving medium) experience a Doppler shift. Suppose the dispersion relation for a non-moving medium is:

$$\omega^2 = \Omega^2(k),\,$$

with k the wavenumber. Then for a medium with mean velocity vector V, the dispersion relationship with Doppler shift becomes:

$$\left( \omega - \mathbf k \cdot \mathbf V \right)^2 = \Omega^2(k),$$

where k is the wavenumber vector, related to k as: k = |k|. The dot product k•V is equal to: k•V = kV cos α, with V the length of the mean velocity vector V: V = |V|. And α the angle between the wave propagation direction and the mean flow direction. For waves and current in the same direction, k•V=kV.

== See also ==
=== Other articles on dispersion ===
- Dispersive partial differential equation
- Capillary wave

=== Dispersive water-wave models ===
- Airy wave theory
- Benjamin–Bona–Mahony equation
- Boussinesq approximation (water waves)
- Cnoidal wave
- Camassa–Holm equation
- Davey–Stewartson equation
- Kadomtsev–Petviashvili equation (also known as KP equation)
- Korteweg–de Vries equation (also known as KdV equation)
- Luke's variational principle
- Nonlinear Schrödinger equation
- Shallow water equations
- Stokes' wave theory
- Trochoidal wave
- Wave turbulence
- Whitham equation
