= Ursell number =

Number used in fluid mechanics

Wave characteristics

In fluid dynamics, the Ursell number indicates the nonlinearity of long surface gravity waves on a fluid layer. This dimensionless parameter is named after Fritz Ursell, who discussed its significance in 1953.

The Ursell number is derived from the Stokes wave expansion, a perturbation series for nonlinear periodic waves, in the long-wave limit of shallow water – when the wavelength is much larger than the water depth. Then the Ursell number U is defined as:

$$U = \frac{H}{h} \left(\frac{\lambda}{h}\right)^2\, =\, \frac{H\, \lambda^2}{h^3},$$

which is, apart from a constant 3 / (32 π^{2}), the ratio of the amplitudes of the second-order to the first-order term in the free surface elevation. The used parameters are:

- H : the wave height, i.e. the difference between the elevations of the wave crest and trough,
- h : the mean water depth, and
- λ : the wavelength, which has to be large compared to the depth, λ ≫ h.

So the Ursell parameter U is the relative wave height H / h times the relative wavelength λ / h squared.

For long waves (λ ≫ h) with small Ursell number, U ≪ 32 π^{2} / 3 ≈ 100, linear wave theory is applicable. Otherwise (and most often) a non-linear theory for fairly long waves (λ > 7 h) – like the Korteweg–de Vries equation or Boussinesq equations – has to be used. The parameter, with different normalisation, was already introduced by George Gabriel Stokes in his historical paper on surface gravity waves of 1847.
