= Undertow (water waves) =

Return flow below nearshore water waves

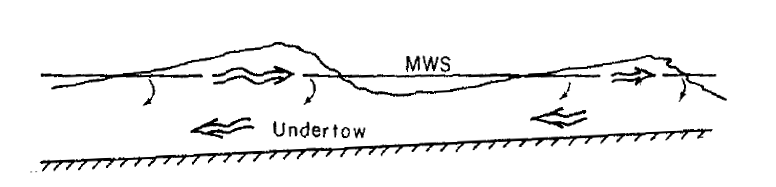
A sketch of the undertow (below the wave troughs) and the shore-directed wave-induced mass transport (above the troughs) in a vertical cross-section across (a part of) the surf zone. Sketch from: Buhr Hansen & Svendsen (1984); MWS = mean water surface.

In physical oceanography, undertow is the undercurrent that moves offshore while waves approach the shore. Undertow is a natural and universal feature for almost any large body of water; it is a return flow compensating for the onshore-directed average transport of water by the waves in the zone above the wave troughs. The undertow's flow velocities are generally strongest in the surf zone, where the water is shallow and the waves are high because of shoaling.

In popular usage, the word undertow is often misapplied to rip currents. An undertow occurs everywhere, underneath the shore-approaching waves, whereas rip currents are localized narrow offshore currents occurring at certain locations along the coast and most forceful by the water's surface.

== Oceanography ==
An "undertow" is a steady, offshore-directed compensation flow, which occurs below waves near the shore. Physically, nearshore, the wave-induced mass flux between wave crest and trough is onshore directed. This mass transport is localized in the upper part of the water column, i.e. above the wave troughs. To compensate for the amount of water being transported towards the shore, a second-order (i.e. proportional to the wave height squared), offshore-directed mean current takes place in the lower section of the water column. This flow – the undertow – affects the nearshore waves everywhere, unlike rip currents localized at certain positions along the shore.

The term undertow is used in scientific coastal oceanography papers. The distribution of flow velocities in the undertow over the water column is important as it strongly influences the on- or offshore transport of sediment. Outside the surf zone there is a near-bed onshore-directed sediment transport induced by Stokes drift and skewed-asymmetric wave transport. In the surf zone, strong undertow generates a near-bed offshore sediment transport. These antagonistic flows may lead to sand bar formation where the flows converge near the wave breaking point, or in the wave breaking zone.

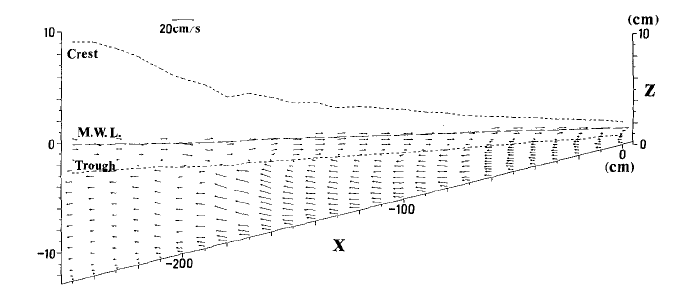
Mean flow-velocity vectors in the undertow under plunging waves, as measured in a laboratory wave flume – by Okayasu, Shibayama & Mimura (1986). Below the wave trough, the mean velocities are directed offshore. The beach slope is 1:20; note that the vertical scale is distorted relative to the horizontal scale.

=== Seaward mass flux ===
An exact relation for the mass flux of a nonlinear periodic wave on an inviscid fluid layer was established by Levi-Civita in 1924. In a frame of reference according to Stokes' first definition of wave celerity, the mass flux $M_w$ of the wave is related to the wave's kinetic energy density $E_k$ (integrated over depth and thereafter averaged over wavelength) and phase speed $c$ through:

$$M_w = \frac{2E_k}{c}.$$

Similarly, Longuet Higgins showed in 1975 that – for the common situation of zero mass flux towards the shore (i.e. Stokes' second definition of wave celerity) – normal-incident periodic waves produce a depth- and time-averaged undertow velocity:

$$\bar{u} = - \frac{2 E_k}{\rho c h},$$

with $h$ the mean water depth and $\rho$ the fluid density. The positive flow direction of $\bar{u}$ is in the wave propagation direction.

For small-amplitude waves, there is equipartition of kinetic ($E_k$) and potential energy ($E_p$):

$$E_w = E_k + E_p \approx 2 E_k \approx 2 E_p,$$

with $E_w$ the total energy density of the wave, integrated over depth and averaged over horizontal space. Since in general the potential energy $E_p$ is much easier to measure than the kinetic energy, the wave energy is approximately ${E_w\approx\tfrac18\rho g H^2}$ (with $H$ the wave height). So

$$\bar{u}\approx -\frac18 \frac{g H^2}{ c h }.$$

For irregular waves the required wave height is the root-mean-square wave height $H_\text{rms}\approx\sqrt{8}\;\sigma,$ with $\sigma$ the standard deviation of the free-surface elevation. The potential energy is $E_p=\tfrac12\rho g \sigma^2$ and $E_w\approx\rho g \sigma^2.$

The distribution of the undertow velocity over the water depth is a topic of ongoing research.

== Confusion with rip currents ==
In contrast to undertow, rip currents are responsible for the great majority of drownings close to beaches. When a swimmer enters a rip current, it starts to carry them offshore. The swimmer can exit the rip current by swimming at right angles to the flow, parallel to the shore, or by simply treading water or floating until the rip releases them. However, drowning can occur when swimmers exhaust themselves by trying unsuccessfully to swim directly against the flow of a rip.

On the United States Lifesaving Association website, it is noted that some uses of the word "undertow" are incorrect:

A rip current is a horizontal current. Rip currents do not pull people under the water—they pull people away from shore. Drowning deaths occur when people pulled offshore are unable to keep themselves afloat and swim to shore. This may be due to any combination of fear, panic, exhaustion, or lack of swimming skills. In some regions, rip currents are referred to by other, incorrect terms such as "rip tides" and "undertow". We encourage exclusive use of the correct term—rip currents. Use of other terms may confuse people and negatively impact public education efforts.

== See also ==
- Longshore current – Sediment moved by the longshore current
