= Waves and shallow water =

Effect of shallow water on a surface gravity wave

When waves travel into areas of shallow water, they begin to be affected by the ocean bottom. The free orbital motion of the water is disrupted, and water particles in orbital motion no longer return to their original position. As the water becomes shallower, the swell becomes higher and steeper, ultimately assuming the familiar sharp-crested wave shape. After the wave breaks, it becomes a wave of translation and erosion of the ocean bottom intensifies.

Cnoidal waves are exact periodic solutions to the Korteweg–de Vries equation in shallow water, that is, when the wavelength of the wave is much greater than the depth of the water.

== See also ==
- Ballantine scale – Marine biology measurement scale
- Boussinesq approximation (water waves) – Approximation valid for weakly non-linear and fairly long waves
- Mild-slope equation – Physics phenomenon and formula
- Shallow water equations – Set of partial differential equations that describe the flow below a pressure surface in a fluid
- Stokes drift – Average velocity of a fluid parcel in a gravity wave
- Undertow (water waves) – Return flow below nearshore water waves.
- Ursell number – Dimensionless number indicating the nonlinearity of long surface gravity waves on a fluid layer.
- Wave shoaling – Effect by which surface waves entering shallower water change in wave height
