= Boussinesq approximation (water waves) =

Approximation valid for weakly non-linear and fairly long waves

Simulation of periodic waves over an underwater shoal with a Boussinesq-type model. The waves propagate over an elliptic-shaped underwater shoal on a plane beach. This example combines several effects of waves and shallow water, including refraction, diffraction, shoaling and weak non-linearity.

In fluid dynamics, the Boussinesq approximation for water waves is an approximation valid for weakly non-linear and fairly long waves. The approximation is named after Joseph Valentin Boussinesq, who first derived them in response to the observation by John Scott Russell of the wave of translation (also known as solitary wave or soliton). The 1872 paper by Boussinesq introduces the equations now known as the Boussinesq equations.

The Boussinesq approximation for water waves takes into account the vertical structure of the horizontal and vertical flow velocity. This results in non-linear partial differential equations, called Boussinesq-type equations, which incorporate frequency dispersion (as opposite to the shallow water equations, which are not frequency-dispersive). In coastal engineering, Boussinesq-type equations are frequently used in computer models for the simulation of water waves in shallow seas and harbours.

While the Boussinesq approximation is applicable to fairly long waves – that is, when the wavelength is large compared to the water depth – the Stokes expansion is more appropriate for short waves (when the wavelength is of the same order as the water depth, or shorter).

== Boussinesq approximation ==
Periodic waves in the Boussinesq approximation, shown in a vertical cross section in the wave propagation direction. Notice the flat troughs and sharp crests, due to the wave nonlinearity. This case (drawn on scale) shows a wave with the wavelength equal to 39.1 m, the wave height is 1.8 m (i.e. the difference between crest and trough elevation), and the mean water depth is 5 m, while the gravitational acceleration is 9.81 m/s^{2}.

The essential idea in the Boussinesq approximation is the elimination of the vertical coordinate from the flow equations, while retaining some of the influences of the vertical structure of the flow under water waves. This is useful because the waves propagate in the horizontal plane and have a different (not wave-like) behaviour in the vertical direction. Often, as in Boussinesq's case, the interest is primarily in the wave propagation.

This elimination of the vertical coordinate was first done by Joseph Boussinesq in 1871, to construct an approximate solution for the solitary wave (or wave of translation). Subsequently, in 1872, Boussinesq derived the equations known nowadays as the Boussinesq equations.

The steps in the Boussinesq approximation are:

- a Taylor expansion is made of the horizontal and vertical flow velocity (or velocity potential) around a certain elevation,
- this Taylor expansion is truncated to a finite number of terms,
- the conservation of mass (see continuity equation) for an incompressible flow and the zero-curl condition for an irrotational flow are used, to replace vertical partial derivatives of quantities in the Taylor expansion with horizontal partial derivatives.

Thereafter, the Boussinesq approximation is applied to the remaining flow equations, in order to eliminate the dependence on the vertical coordinate. As a result, the resulting partial differential equations are in terms of functions of the horizontal coordinates (and time).

As an example, consider potential flow over a horizontal bed in the $(x,z)$ plane, with $x$ the horizontal and $z$ the vertical coordinate. The bed is located at $z=-h$, where $h$ is the mean water depth. A Taylor expansion is made of the velocity potential $\varphi(x,z,t)$ around the bed level $z=-h$:

$$\begin{align}
\varphi\, =\, &
\varphi_b\,
+\,                (z+h)\,   \left[ \frac{\partial   \varphi}{\partial z  } \right]_{z=-h}\,
+\, \frac{1}{2}\,  (z+h)^2\, \left[ \frac{\partial^2 \varphi}{\partial z^2} \right]_{z=-h}\,
\\ &
+\, \frac{1}{6}\,  (z+h)^3\, \left[ \frac{\partial^3 \varphi}{\partial z^3} \right]_{z=-h}\,
+\, \frac{1}{24}\, (z+h)^4\, \left[ \frac{\partial^4 \varphi}{\partial z^4} \right]_{z=-h}\,
+\, \cdots,
\end{align}$$

where $\varphi_b(x,t)$ is the velocity potential at the bed. Invoking Laplace's equation for $\varphi$, as valid for incompressible flow, gives:

$$\begin{align}
\varphi\, =\, &
\left\{\,
\varphi_b\,
-\, \frac{1}{2}\,  (z+h)^2\, \frac{\partial^2 \varphi_b}{\partial x^2}\,
+\, \frac{1}{24}\, (z+h)^4\, \frac{\partial^4 \varphi_b}{\partial x^4}\,
+\, \cdots\,
\right\}\,
\\
& +\,
\left\{\,
(z+h)\,                                   \left[ \frac{\partial \varphi}{\partial z} \right]_{z=-h}\,
-\, \frac16\,  (z+h)^3\, \frac{\partial^2}{\partial x^2} \left[ \frac{\partial \varphi}{\partial z} \right]_{z=-h}\,
+\, \cdots\,
\right\}
\\
=\, &
\left\{\,
\varphi_b\,
-\, \frac{1}{2}\,  (z+h)^2\, \frac{\partial^2 \varphi_b}{\partial x^2}\,
+\, \frac{1}{24}\, (z+h)^4\, \frac{\partial^4 \varphi_b}{\partial x^4}\,
+\, \cdots\,
\right\},
\end{align}$$

since the vertical velocity $\partial\varphi/\partial z$ is zero at the – impermeable – horizontal bed $z=-h$. This series may subsequently be truncated to a finite number of terms.

== Original Boussinesq equations ==
=== Derivation ===
For water waves on an incompressible fluid and irrotational flow in the $(x,z)$ plane, the boundary conditions at the free surface elevation $z=\eta(x,t)$ are:

$$\begin{align}
\frac{\partial \eta}{\partial t}\, &+\, u\, \frac{\partial \eta}{\partial x}\, -\, w\, =\, 0
\\
\frac{\partial \varphi}{\partial t}\, &+\, \frac{1}{2}\, \left( u^2 + w^2 \right)\, +\, g\, \eta\, =\, 0,
\end{align}$$

where:

- $u$ is the horizontal flow velocity component: $u=\partial\varphi/\partial x$,
- $w$ is the vertical flow velocity component: $w=\partial\varphi/\partial z$,
- $g$ is the acceleration by gravity.

Now the Boussinesq approximation for the velocity potential $\varphi$, as given above, is applied in these boundary conditions. Further, in the resulting equations only the linear and quadratic terms with respect to $\eta$ and $u_b$ are retained (with $u_b=\partial\varphi_b/\partial x$ the horizontal velocity at the bed $z=-h$). The cubic and higher order terms are assumed to be negligible. Then, the following partial differential equations are obtained:

set A – Boussinesq (1872), equation (25)

$$\begin{align}
\frac{\partial \eta}{\partial t}\,
& +\, \frac{\partial}{\partial x}\, \left[ \left( h + \eta \right)\, u_b \right]\,
=\, \frac{1}{6}\, h^3\, \frac{\partial^3 u_b}{\partial x^3},
\\
\frac{\partial u_b}{\partial t}\,
& +\, u_b\, \frac{\partial u_b}{\partial x}\,
+\, g\, \frac{\partial \eta}{\partial x}\,
=\, \frac{1}{2}\, h^2\, \frac{\partial^3 u_b}{\partial t\, \partial x^2}.
\end{align}$$

This set of equations has been derived for a flat horizontal bed, i.e. the mean depth $h$ is a constant independent of position $x$. When the right-hand sides of the above equations are set to zero, they reduce to the shallow water equations.

Under some additional approximations, but at the same order of accuracy, the above set A can be reduced to a single partial differential equation for the free surface elevation $\eta$:

set B – Boussinesq (1872), equation (26)

$$\frac{\partial^2 \eta}{\partial t^2}\,
-\, g h\, \frac{\partial^2 \eta}{\partial x^2}\,
-\, g h\, \frac{\partial^2}{\partial x^2}
\left(
\frac{3}{2}\, \frac{\eta^2}{h}\,
+\, \frac{1}{3}\, h^2\, \frac{\partial^2 \eta}{\partial x^2}
\right)\, =\, 0.$$

From the terms between brackets, the importance of nonlinearity of the equation can be expressed in terms of the Ursell number. In dimensionless quantities, using the water depth $h$ and gravitational acceleration $g$ for non-dimensionalization, this equation reads, after normalization:

$$\frac{\partial^2 \psi}{\partial \tau^2}\,
-\, \frac{\partial^2 \psi}{\partial \xi^2}\,
-\, \frac{\partial^2}{\partial \xi^2}
\left(\,
3\, \psi^2\,
+\, \frac{\partial^2 \psi}{\partial \xi^2}\,
\right)\, =\, 0,$$

with:

$\psi\, =\, \frac12\, \frac{\eta}{h}$	: the dimensionless surface elevation,
$\tau\, =\, \sqrt{3}\, t\, \sqrt{\frac{g}{h}}$	: the dimensionless time, and
$\xi\, =\, \sqrt{3}\, \frac{x}{h}$	: the dimensionless horizontal position.

Linear phase speed squared $c^2/(gh)$ as a function of relative wave number $kh$. A = Boussinesq (1872), equation (25), B = Boussinesq (1872), equation (26), C = full linear wave theory, see dispersion (water waves)

=== Linear frequency dispersion ===
Water waves of different wave lengths travel with different phase speeds, a phenomenon known as frequency dispersion. For the case of infinitesimal wave amplitude, the terminology is linear frequency dispersion. The frequency dispersion characteristics of a Boussinesq-type of equation can be used to determine the range of wave lengths, for which it is a valid approximation.

The linear frequency dispersion characteristics for the above set A of equations are:

$$c^2\, =\; g h\, \frac{ 1\, +\, \frac{1}{6}\, k^2 h^2 }{ 1\, +\, \frac{1}{2}\, k^2 h^2 },$$

with:

- $c$ the phase speed,
- $k$ the wave number ($k=2\pi/\lambda$, with $\lambda$ the wave length).

The relative error in the phase speed $c$ for set A, as compared with linear theory for water waves, is less than 4% for a relative wave number $kh<\pi/2$. So, in engineering applications, set A is valid for wavelengths $\lambda$ larger than 4 times the water depth $h$.

The linear frequency dispersion characteristics of equation B are:

$$c^2\, =\, g h\, \left( 1\, -\, \frac{1}{3}\, k^2 h^2 \right).$$

The relative error in the phase speed for equation B is less than 4% for $kh<2\pi/7$, equivalent to wave lengths $\lambda$ longer than 7 times the water depth $h$, called fairly long waves.

For short waves with $k^2 h^2>3$ equation B become physically meaningless, because there are no longer real-valued solutions of the phase speed. The original set of two partial differential equations (Boussinesq, 1872, equation 25, see set A above) does not have this shortcoming.

The shallow water equations have a relative error in the phase speed less than 4% for wave lengths $\lambda$ in excess of 13 times the water depth $h$.

== Boussinesq-type equations and extensions ==
There are an overwhelming number of mathematical models which are referred to as Boussinesq equations. This may easily lead to confusion, since often they are loosely referenced to as the Boussinesq equations, while in fact a variant thereof is considered. So it is more appropriate to call them Boussinesq-type equations. Strictly speaking, the Boussinesq equations is the above-mentioned set B, since it is used in the analysis in the remainder of his 1872 paper.

Some directions, into which the Boussinesq equations have been extended, are:

- varying bathymetry,
- improved frequency dispersion,
- improved non-linear behavior,
- making a Taylor expansion around different vertical elevations,
- dividing the fluid domain in layers, and applying the Boussinesq approximation in each layer separately,
- inclusion of wave breaking,
- inclusion of surface tension,
- extension to internal waves on an interface between fluid domains of different mass density,
- derivation from a variational principle.

== Further approximations for one-way wave propagation ==
While the Boussinesq equations allow for waves traveling simultaneously in opposing directions, it is often advantageous to only consider waves traveling in one direction. Under small additional assumptions, the Boussinesq equations reduce to:

- the Korteweg–de Vries equation for wave propagation in one horizontal dimension,
- the Kadomtsev–Petviashvili equation for (near uni-directional) wave propagation in two horizontal dimensions,
- the nonlinear Schrödinger equation (NLS equation) for the complex-valued amplitude of narrowband waves (slowly modulated waves).

Besides solitary wave solutions, the Korteweg–de Vries equation also has periodic and exact solutions, called cnoidal waves. These are approximate solutions of the Boussinesq equation.

== Numerical models ==
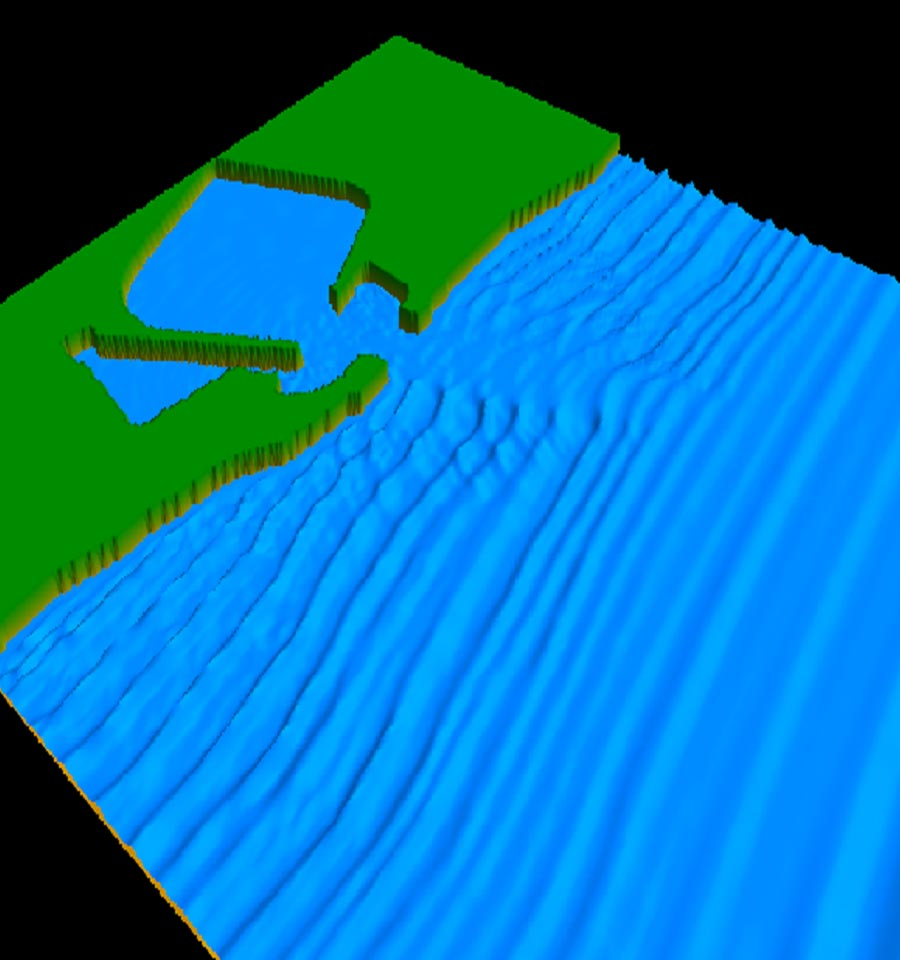
A simulation with a Boussinesq-type wave model of nearshore waves travelling towards a harbour entrance. The simulation is with the BOUSS-2D module of SMS.

Faster than real-time simulation with the Boussinesq module of Celeris, showing wave breaking and refraction near the beach. The model provides an interactive environment.

For the simulation of wave motion near coasts and harbours, numerical models – both commercial and academic – employing Boussinesq-type equations exist. Some commercial examples are the Boussinesq-type wave modules in MIKE 21 and SMS. Some of the free Boussinesq models are Celeris, COULWAVE, and FUNWAVE. Most numerical models employ finite-difference, finite-volume or finite element techniques for the discretization of the model equations. Scientific reviews and intercomparisons of several Boussinesq-type equations, their numerical approximation and performance are e.g. Kirby (2003), Dingemans (1997, Part 2, Chapter 5) and Hamm, Madsen & Peregrine (1993).
