= Surface elevation =

In fluid dynamics, surface elevation, also called surface height or free-surface elevation, is the height of a free surface relative to a specified reference level. Values are positive above the reference and negative below it. The symbol $\eta$ is used for surface elevation in descriptions of water waves and shallow-water flow.

Sources contain slightly different definitions of surface elevation, primarily varying the choice of reference. For example, sea-surface height can be meaqsured above a geoid or above a reference ellipsoid.

== Definitions ==
=== Height above a fixed reference level ===
The British Oceanographic Data Centre's vocabulary defines surface elevation as a signed vertical distance from a fixed reference point. In ocean data, the CF Standard Name Table distinguishes sea-surface height above mean sea level, above the geoid, and above a reference ellipsoid. In that table, mean sea level is a local time average taken over a period long enough to remove tidal variations.

=== Displacement from still-water level ===
Sinusoidal wave parameters: depth d, amplitude a, wave height H, still water level SWL

In linear water-wave theory, surface elevation is measured from the still-water level (SWL). As a result, it is positive at a wave crest and negative at a wave trough. For a small-amplitude sinusoidal wave, the crest elevation and the depth of the trough below that level both equal the amplitude. Wave height is measured from a trough to the crest that follows it. In a sinusoidal wave it equals twice the amplitude.

=== Height and displacement in shallow-water models ===
In the shallow water equations, the height of the free surface can be distinguished from both water depth and displacement from a mean level. In Geoffrey K. Vallis's notation, $\eta$ is the height of the water surface and $\eta_b$ is the height of the bottom, both measured from the same arbitrary origin. The water depth $h$ is thus their difference:

$$h=\eta-\eta_b.$$

If the origin is chosen as an average bottom height:

$$\eta=\eta_b+h=H+\Delta\eta,$$

where $H$ is the mean water depth and $\Delta\eta$ is the surface displacement from its mean level. Thus, $\eta$ is a height measured from the origin, and $\Delta\eta$ is how far the surface sits above or below its mean.

=== Sea-surface height and anomalies ===
Copernicus Marine Service uses two definitions of sea-surface height (SSH):

- For ocean models, SSH is the height above the geoid, the reference surface set by Earth's gravity field.
- For satellite altimetry, SSH is the height above a reference ellipsoid, a mathematical approximation to Earth's shape.

The model quantity corresponds to absolute dynamic topography (ADT) in altimetry.

A sea-level anomaly (SLA) is the difference between the sea-surface height and a mean sea surface (MSS):

$$\mathrm{SLA}=\mathrm{SSH}-\mathrm{MSS}.$$

The mean surface is calculated over a specified reference period, so the anomaly depends on that period.

== See also ==
- Ocean surface topography
- Vertical datum
