= Wave height =

Difference between the elevations of a crest and a neighbouring trough

Wave characteristics

In fluid dynamics, the wave height of a surface wave is the difference between the elevations of a crest and a neighboring trough. Wave height is a term used by mariners, as well as in coastal, ocean and naval engineering.

At sea, the term significant wave height is used as a means to introduce a well-defined and standardized statistic to denote the characteristic height of the random waves in a sea state, including wind sea and swell. It is defined in such a way that it more or less corresponds to what a mariner observes when estimating visually the average wave height.

== Definitions ==
Depending on context, wave height may be defined in different ways:

- For a sine wave, the wave height H is twice the amplitude (i.e., the peak-to-peak amplitude):
  $$H = 2a.$$
- For a periodic wave, it is simply the difference between the maximum and minimum of the surface elevation z = η(x – c_{p} t):
  $$H = \max\left\{ \eta(x\,-\,c_p\,t) \right\} - \min\left\{ \eta(x - c_p\,t) \right\},$$
  with c_{p} the phase speed (or propagation speed) of the wave. The sine wave is a specific case of a periodic wave.
- In random waves at sea, when the surface elevations are measured with a wave buoy, the individual wave height H_{m} of each individual wave—with an integer label m, running from 1 to N, to denote its position in a sequence of N waves—is the difference in elevation between a wave crest and trough in that wave. For this to be possible, it is necessary to first split the measured time series of the surface elevation into individual waves. Commonly, an individual wave is denoted as the time interval between two successive downward-crossings through the average surface elevation (upward crossings might also be used). Then the individual wave height of each wave is again the difference between maximum and minimum elevation in the time interval of the wave under consideration.

=== Significant wave height ===
In physical oceanography, the significant wave height (SWH, HTSGW or H_{s}) is defined traditionally as the mean wave height (trough to crest) of the highest third of the waves (H_{1/3}). It is usually defined as four times the standard deviation of the surface elevation – or equivalently as four times the square root of the zeroth-order moment (area) of the wave spectrum. The symbol H_{m0} is usually used for that latter definition. The significant wave height (H_{s}) may thus refer to H_{m0} or H_{1/3}; the difference in magnitude between the two definitions is only a few percent. SWH is used to characterize sea state, including winds and swell.

=== RMS wave height ===
Another wave-height statistic in common usage is the root-mean-square (or RMS) wave height H_{rms}, defined as:
$$H_\text{rms} = \sqrt{ \frac{1}{N} \sum_{m=1}^N H_m^2},$$
with H_{m} again denoting the individual wave heights in a certain time series.

== See also ==
- Sea state
- Wind wave
