= Crest and trough =

Feature of a transverse wave

Crest and trough in a wave

A crest point on a wave is the highest point of the wave. A crest is a point on a surface wave where the displacement of the medium is at a maximum. A trough is the opposite of a crest, so the minimum or lowest point of the wave.

When the crests and troughs of two sine waves of equal amplitude and frequency intersect or collide, while being in phase with each other, the result is called constructive interference and the magnitudes double (above and below the line). When in antiphase – 180° out of phase – the result is destructive interference: the resulting wave is the undisturbed line having zero amplitude.

== See also ==
- Crest factor
- Superposition principle
- Wave
