= Eddy saturation and eddy compensation =

Eddy saturation and eddy compensation are phenomena found in the Southern Ocean. Both are limiting processes where eddy activity increases due to the momentum of strong westerlies, and hence do not enhance their respective mean currents. Where eddy saturations impacts the Antarctic Circumpolar Current (ACC), eddy compensation influences the associated Meridional Overturning Circulation (MOC).

In recent decades wind stresses in the Southern Ocean have increased partly due to greenhouse gases and ozone depletion in the stratosphere. Because the ACC and MOC play an important role in the global climate; affecting the stratification of the ocean, uptake of heat, carbon dioxide and other passive tracers. Addressing how these increased zonal winds affect the MOC and the ACC will help understand whether the uptakes will change in the future, which could have serious impact on the carbon cycle. This remains an important and critical research topic.

== Formation of eddies and overturning response ==
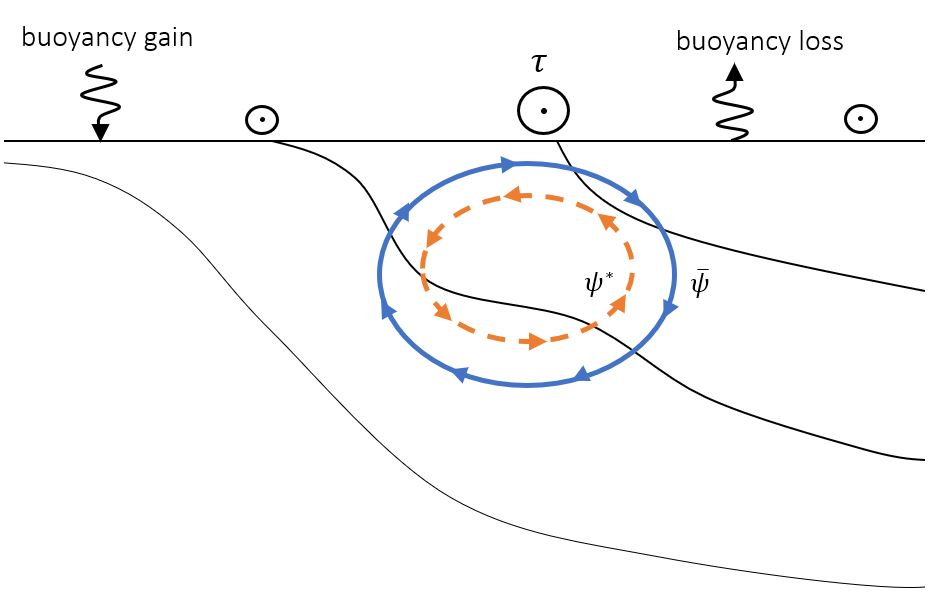
Schematic response of the Eulerian cell and eddy overturning circulation driven by wind stress ($\tau$) and buoyancy fluxes in the Southern Ocean. The thin black lines represent the isopycnals, which slope down toward Antarctica. The Eulerian mean cell ($\overline{\psi}$) rotates clockwise and counteracts the eddy induced circulation ($\psi*$) which rotates counterclockwise.

Dynamics in the Southern Ocean are dominated by two cells with opposing rotation, each is forced by surface buoyancy fluxes. Via isopycnals, tracers are transferred from the deep to the surface. Isopycnal slopes are key for determining the depth of the global Pycnocline, and where water mass outcrops are. Therefore, isopycnals play an important role in the interaction with the atmosphere. In the Southern Ocean it is thought that isopycnals are steepened by wind forcing and baroclinic eddies are acting to flatten the isopycnals.

The westerly winds ($\tau$), which make the ACC flow eastward, induce a clockwise rotating Eulerian meridional circulation ($\overline{\psi}$) via Ekman dynamics, which is also known as the Deacon cell. This circulation acts to overturn isopycnals, enhance the buoyancy forcing, and therefore increase the mean flow.

Although the ACC is very close to a geostrophic balance, when frontal jets reach a velocity that is high enough geostrophic turbulence (i.e. chaotic motion of fluids that are near to a state of hydrostatic balance and geostrophic balance) arises. Due to this geostrophic turbulence, potential energy stored in the fronts of jet streams is converted into eddy kinetic energy (EKE), which finally leads to the formation of mesoscale eddies. The surface EKE has increased in the recent decades, as proven by satellite altimetry. The relation between the increased wind stress and EKE is assumed to be near-linear, which explains the limited sensitivity of the ACC transport.

In areas where stratification is very weak the formation of eddies is often associated with barotropic instabilities. Where stratification is more substantial, baroclinic instabilities (misalignment of isobars and isopycnals) are the mean cause of the formation of eddies. Eddies have the tendency to flatten isopycnals (surfaces of equal buoyancy), which slow down the mean flow. Due to these instabilities a counterclockwise rotating eddy-induced circulation ($\psi*$) is formed, which partially counteracts the Eulerian meridional circulation.

The balance between the two overturning circulations determines the residual overturning, $\psi_{res} = \overline{\psi} + \psi*$. This residual flow ($\psi_{res}$) is assumed to be directed along mean buoyancy surfaces in the interior but to have a diapycnal component in the mixed layer.

== Eddy saturation ==
The Southern Ocean contains a system of ocean currents, which together forms the Antarctic Circumpolar Current (ACC). These ocean currents are subject to strong westerly winds jointly responsible for driving the zonal transport of the ACC. In recent decades a positive trend in SAM index (Southern Annular Mode) is seen, which measures the zonal pressure difference between the latitudes of 40S and 65S, showing us that the zonal winds have increased in the Southern Ocean. Studies indicate that the zonal Ekman transport in the ACC is relatively insensitive to the increasing changes in wind stress. This behaviour can also be seen in the change in isopycnal slopes (surfaces of equal buoyancy), which show limited response despite intensification of western winds. Therefore, the increased momentum (due to enhanced wind stress) is diverted into the oceanic mesoscale and transferred to the bottom of the ocean instead of the horizontal mean flow. This flattens isopycnals (reduces buoyancy forcing) and therefore slows down the mean flow. This phenomenon is known as eddy saturation.

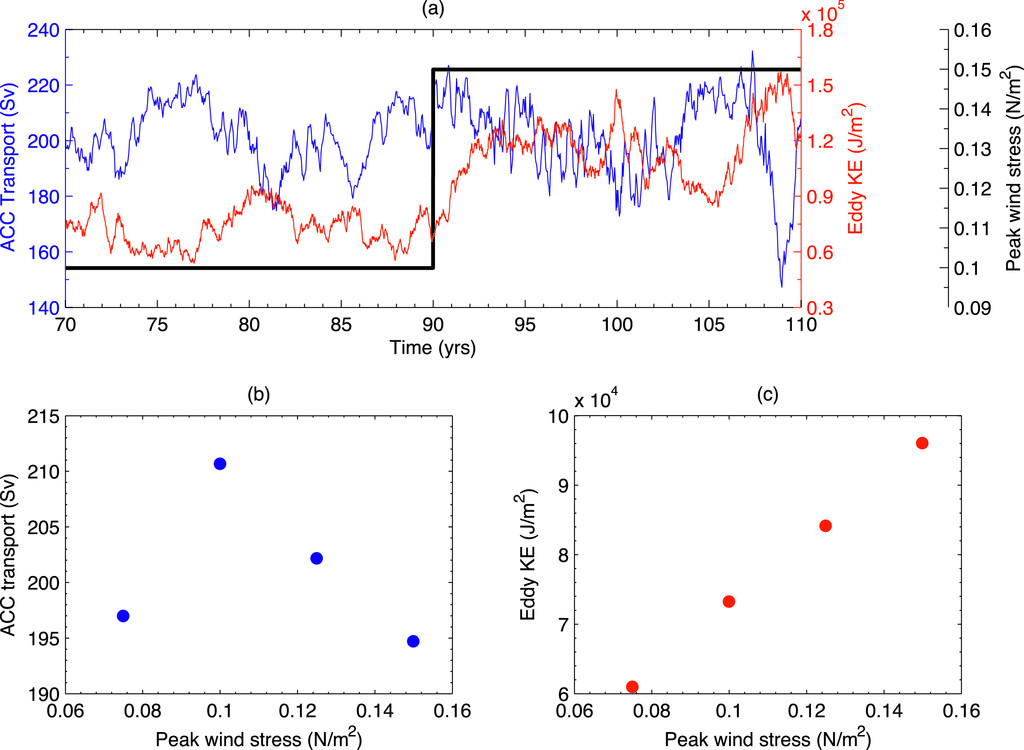
(a) Time series of the ACC (blue) and EKE (red) in an eddy saturated quasigeostrophic coupled ocean-atmosphere model with an applied with stress, which is increased with a step function by 50% (black). (b) ACC transport as a function of peak wind stress. (c) EKE transport as a function of peak wind stress.

== Eddy compensation ==
Alongside the ACC there is also the associated Meridional Overturning Circulation (MOC), which is also mainly driven by wind forcing. The insensitivity of the mean current to the accelerating wind forcing can also be seen in the MOC. This near independence of the MOC to the increase of wind stress is referred to as eddy compensation. There would be perfect eddy compensation when the Ekman transport would be balanced by eddy-induced transport.

There is a widespread belief that the sensitivities of the transport in the ACC and MOC are dynamically linked. However, note that eddy saturation and eddy compensation are distinct dynamical mechanisms. Occurrence of one does not necessarily entail the occurrence of the other. It is hypothesized that dearth of a dynamical link between eddy saturation and eddy compensation is a consequence of the depth dependence (cancellation between the Eulerian circulation and eddy-induced circulation). Currently it is assumed that the ACC is fully eddy saturated, but only partially eddy compensated. The degree to which there is eddy compensation in the Southern Ocean is currently unknown.

== Models and sensitivity ==
Eddy permitting and eddy resolving models are used to examine the effect of eddy saturation and eddy compensation in the ACC. In these models resolution is of great importance. Ocean observations do not have a high enough resolution to fully estimate the degree of eddy saturation and eddy compensation. Idealized studies show that the MOC response is more sensitive to model resolution than the ACC transport. A general conclusion in such numerical models is that southward eddy transport in combination with enhanced westerlies results in an increase in EKE.

== See also ==
- Antarctic Circumpolar Current – Ocean current that flows clockwise from west to east around Antarctica
- Coriolis-Stokes force – Concept in fluid dynamics
- Meridional overturning circulation – Part of large-scale ocean circulation
- Stokes drift – Average velocity of a fluid parcel in a gravity wave
