= Radiation stress =

Term in physical oceanography

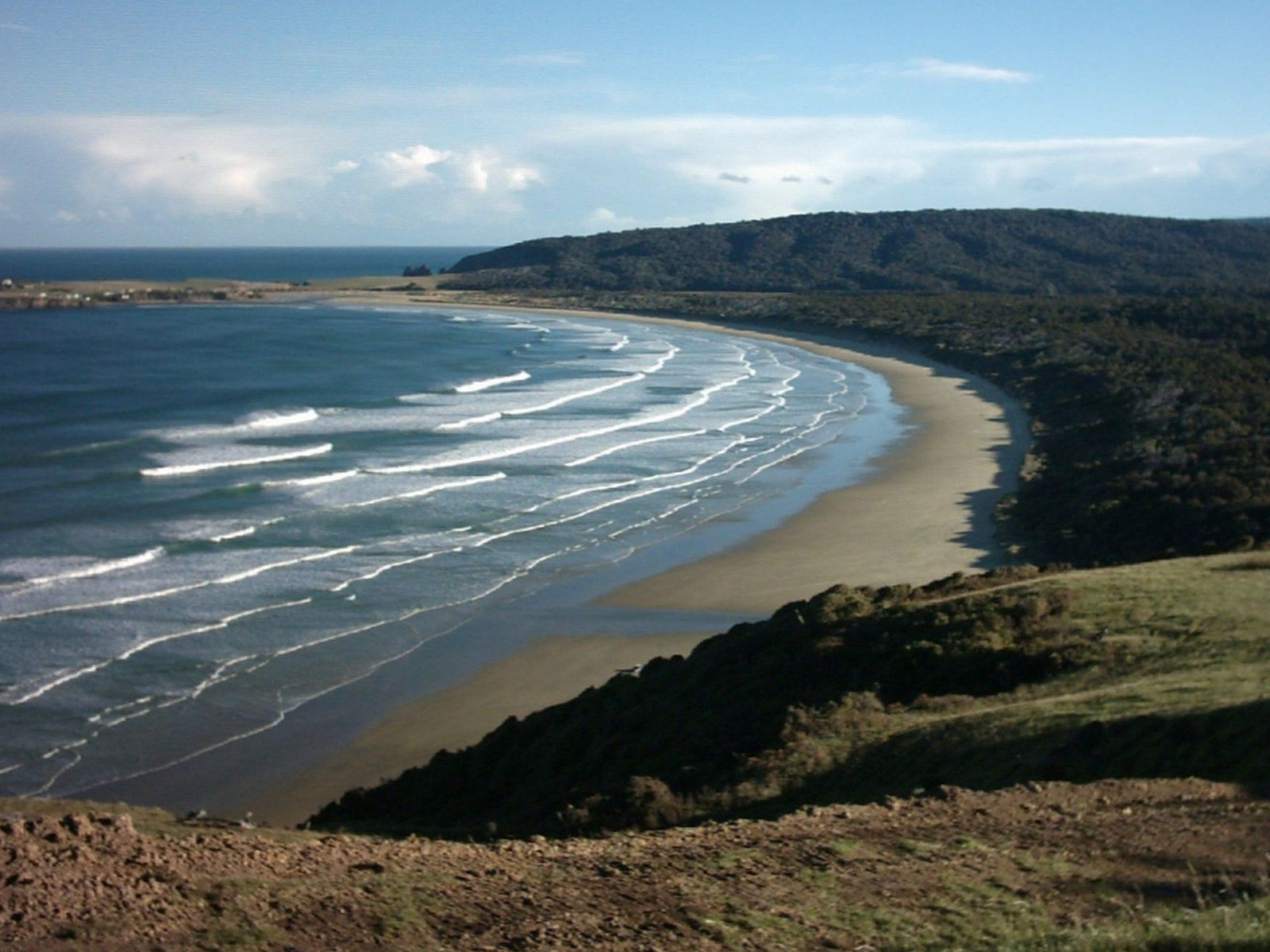
Breaking waves on beaches induce variations in radiation stress, driving longshore currents. The resulting longshore sediment transport shapes the beaches, and may result in beach erosion or accretion.

In fluid dynamics, the radiation stress is the depth-integrated – and thereafter phase-averaged – excess momentum flux caused by the presence of the surface gravity waves, which is exerted on the mean flow. The radiation stresses behave as a second-order tensor.

The radiation stress tensor describes the additional forcing due to the presence of the waves, which changes the mean depth-integrated horizontal momentum in the fluid layer. As a result, varying radiation stresses induce changes in the mean surface elevation (wave setup) and the mean flow (wave-induced currents).

For the mean energy density in the oscillatory part of the fluid motion, the radiation stress tensor is important for its dynamics, in case of an inhomogeneous mean-flow field.

The radiation stress tensor, as well as several of its implications on the physics of surface gravity waves and mean flows, were formulated in a series of papers by Longuet-Higgins and Stewart in 1960–1964.

Radiation stress derives its name from the analogous effect of radiation pressure for electromagnetic radiation.

== Physical significance ==
The radiation stress – mean excess momentum-flux due to the presence of the waves – plays an important role in the explanation and modeling of various coastal processes:

- Wave setup and setdown – the radiation stress consists in part of a radiation pressure, exerted at the free surface elevation of the mean flow. If the radiation stress varies spatially, as it does in the surf zone where the wave height reduces by wave breaking, this results in changes of the mean surface elevation called wave setup (in case of an increased level) and setdown (for a decreased water level);
- Wave-driven current, especially a longshore current in the surf zone – for oblique incidence of waves on a beach, the reduction in wave height inside the surf zone (by breaking) introduces a variation of the shear-stress component S_{xy} of the radiation stress over the width of the surf zone. This provides the forcing of a wave-driven longshore current, which is of importance for sediment transport (longshore drift) and the resulting coastal morphology;
- Bound long waves or forced long waves, part of the infragravity waves – for wave groups the radiation stress varies along the group. As a result, a non-linear long wave propagates together with the group, at the group velocity of the modulated short waves within the group. While, according to the dispersion relation, a long wave of this length should propagate at its own – higher – phase velocity. The amplitude of this bound long wave varies with the square of the wave height, and is only significant in shallow water;
- Wave–current interaction – in varying mean-flow fields, the energy exchanges between the waves and the mean flow, as well as the mean-flow forcing, can be modeled by means of the radiation stress.

== Definitions and values derived from linear wave theory ==
=== One-dimensional wave propagation ===
For uni-directional wave propagation – say in the x-coordinate direction – the component of the radiation stress tensor of dynamical importance is S_{xx}. It is defined as:

$$S_{xx} = \overline{ \int_{-h}^\eta \left( p + \rho \tilde{u}^2 \right)\; \text{d}z } - \frac12 \rho g \left( h + \overline{\eta} \right)^2,$$

where p(x,z,t) is the fluid pressure, $\tilde{u}(x,z,t)$ is the horizontal x-component of the oscillatory part of the flow velocity vector, z is the vertical coordinate, t is time, z = −h(x) is the bed elevation of the fluid layer, and z = η(x,t) is the surface elevation. Further ρ is the fluid density and g is the acceleration by gravity, while an overbar denotes phase averaging. The last term on the right-hand side, 1/2ρg(h+η̅)^{2}, is the integral of the hydrostatic pressure over the still-water depth.

To lowest (second) order, the radiation stress S_{xx} for traveling periodic waves can be determined from the properties of surface gravity waves according to Airy wave theory:

$$S_{xx} = \left( 2 \frac{c_g}{c_p} - \frac12 \right) E,$$

where c_{p} is the phase speed and c_{g} is the group speed of the waves. Further E is the mean depth-integrated wave energy density (the sum of the kinetic and potential energy) per unit of horizontal area. From the results of Airy wave theory, to second order, the mean energy density E equals:

$$E = \frac12 \rho g a^2 = \frac18 \rho g H^2,$$

with a the wave amplitude and H = 2a the wave height. Note this equation is for periodic waves: in random waves the root-mean-square wave height H_{rms} should be used with H_{rms} = H_{m0} / √2, where H_{m0} is the significant wave height. Then E = 1/16ρgH_{m0}^{2}.

=== Two-dimensional wave propagation ===
For wave propagation in two horizontal dimensions the radiation stress $\mathbf{S}$ is a second-order tensor with components:

$$\mathbf{S}= \begin{pmatrix} S_{xx} & S_{xy} \\ S_{yx} & S_{yy} \end{pmatrix}.$$

With, in a Cartesian coordinate system (x,y,z):

$$\begin{align}
S_{xx} &= \overline{ \int_{-h}^\eta \left( p + \rho \tilde{u}^2 \right)\; \text{d}z }
- \frac12 \rho g \left( h + \overline{\eta} \right)^2, \\
S_{xy} &= \overline{ \int_{-h}^\eta \left( \rho \tilde{u} \tilde{v} \right)\; \text{d}z } = S_{yx}, \\
S_{yy} &= \overline{ \int_{-h}^\eta \left( p + \rho \tilde{v}^2 \right)\; \text{d}z }
- \frac12 \rho g \left( h + \overline{\eta} \right)^2,
\end{align}$$

where $\tilde{u}$ and $\tilde{v}$ are the horizontal x- and y-components of the oscillatory part $\tilde{u}(x,y,z,t)$ of the flow velocity vector.

To second order – in wave amplitude a – the components of the radiation stress tensor for progressive periodic waves are:

$$\begin{align}
S_{xx} &= \left[ \frac{k_x^2}{k^2} \frac{c_g}{c_p} + \left( \frac{c_g}{c_p} - \frac12 \right) \right] E,
\\
S_{xy} &= \left( \frac{k_x k_y}{k^2} \frac{c_g}{c_p} \right) E = S_{yx},
\quad \text{and}
\\
S_{yy} &= \left[ \frac{k_y^2}{k^2} \frac{c_g}{c_p} + \left( \frac{c_g}{c_p} - \frac12 \right) \right] E,
\end{align}$$

where k_{x} and k_{y} are the x- and y-components of the wavenumber vector k, with length k = |k| = √k_{x}^{2}+k_{y}^{2} and the vector k perpendicular to the wave crests. The phase and group speeds, c_{p} and c_{g} respectively, are the lengths of the phase and group velocity vectors: c_{p} = |c_{p}| and c_{g} = |c_{g}|.

== Dynamical significance ==
The radiation stress tensor is an important quantity in the description of the phase-averaged dynamical interaction between waves and mean flows. Here, the depth-integrated dynamical conservation equations are given, but – in order to model three-dimensional mean flows forced by or interacting with surface waves – a three-dimensional description of the radiation stress over the fluid layer is needed.

=== Mass transport velocity ===
Propagating waves induce a – relatively small – mean mass transport in the wave propagation direction, also called the wave (pseudo) momentum. To lowest order, the wave momentum M_{w} is, per unit of horizontal area:

$$\boldsymbol{M}_w = \frac{\boldsymbol{k}}{k} \frac{E}{c_p},$$

which is exact for progressive waves of permanent form in irrotational flow. Above, c_{p} is the phase speed relative to the mean flow:

$$c_p = \frac{\sigma}{k} \qquad \text{with} \qquad \sigma=\omega - \boldsymbol{k}\cdot\overline{\boldsymbol{v}},$$

with σ the intrinsic angular frequency, as seen by an observer moving with the mean horizontal flow-velocity v̅ while ω is the apparent angular frequency of an observer at rest (with respect to 'Earth'). The difference k⋅v̅ is the Doppler shift.

The mean horizontal momentum M, also per unit of horizontal area, is the mean value of the integral of momentum over depth:

$$\boldsymbol{M} = \overline{\int_{-h}^\eta \rho\, \boldsymbol{v}\; \text{d}z}
= \rho\, \left( h + \overline{\eta} \right) \overline{\boldsymbol{v}} + \boldsymbol{M}_w,$$

with v(x,y,z,t) the total flow velocity at any point below the free surface z = η(x,y,t). The mean horizontal momentum M is also the mean of the depth-integrated horizontal mass flux, and consists of two contributions: one by the mean current and the other (M_{w}) is due to the waves.

Now the mass transport velocity u̅ is defined as:

$$\overline{\boldsymbol{u}} = \frac{\boldsymbol{M}}{\rho\, \left( h + \overline{\eta} \right)}
= \overline{\boldsymbol{v}}
+ \frac{\boldsymbol{M}_w}{\rho\, \left( h + \overline{\eta} \right)}.$$

Observe that first the depth-integrated horizontal momentum is averaged, before the division by the mean water depth (h+η̅) is made.

=== Mass and momentum conservation ===
==== Vector notation ====
The equation of mean mass conservation is, in vector notation:

$$\frac{\partial}{\partial t}\left[ \rho \left( h + \overline{\eta} \right) \right] + \nabla \cdot \left[ \rho \left( h + \overline{\eta} \right) \overline{\boldsymbol{u}} \right] = 0,$$

with u̅ including the contribution of the wave momentum M_{w}.

The equation for the conservation of horizontal mean momentum is:

$$\frac{\partial}{\partial t}\left[ \rho \left( h + \overline{\eta} \right) \overline{\boldsymbol{u}} \right] + \nabla \cdot \left[ \rho \left( h + \overline{\eta} \right) \overline{\boldsymbol{u}} \otimes  \overline{\boldsymbol{u}} + \mathbf{S} + \frac12 \rho g (h+\overline{\eta})^2\, \mathbf{I} \right] = \rho g \left( h + \overline{\eta} \right) \nabla h + \boldsymbol{\tau}_w - \boldsymbol{\tau}_b,$$

where u̅ ⊗ u̅ denotes the tensor product of u̅ with itself, and τ_{w} is the mean wind shear stress at the free surface, while τ_{b} is the bed shear stress. Further I is the identity tensor, with components given by the Kronecker delta δ_{ij}. Note that the right hand side of the momentum equation provides the non-conservative contributions of the bed slope ∇h, as well the forcing by the wind and the bed friction.

In terms of the horizontal momentum M the above equations become:

$$\begin{align}
&\frac{\partial}{\partial t}\left[ \rho \left( h + \overline{\eta} \right) \right]
+ \nabla \cdot \boldsymbol{M} = 0,
\\
&\frac{\partial \boldsymbol{M}}{\partial t}
+ \nabla \cdot \left[ \overline{\boldsymbol{u}} \otimes  \boldsymbol{M} + \mathbf{S}
+ \frac12 \rho g (h+\overline{\eta})^2\, \mathbf{I} \right]
= \rho g \left( h + \overline{\eta} \right) \nabla h
+ \boldsymbol{\tau}_w - \boldsymbol{\tau}_b.
\end{align}$$

==== Component form in Cartesian coordinates ====
In a Cartesian coordinate system, the mass conservation equation becomes:

$$\frac{\partial}{\partial t} \left[ \rho \left( h + \overline{\eta} \right) \right] + \frac{\partial}{\partial x} \left[ \rho \left( h + \overline{\eta} \right) \overline{u}_x \right] + \frac{\partial}{\partial y} \left[ \rho \left( h + \overline{\eta} \right) \overline{u}_y \right] = 0,$$

with u̅_{x} and u̅_{y} respectively the x and y components of the mass transport velocity u̅.

The horizontal momentum equations are:

$$\begin{align}
\frac{\partial}{\partial t}\left[ \rho \left( h + \overline{\eta} \right) \overline{u}_x \right]
&+ \frac{\partial}{\partial x}
\left[ \rho \left( h + \overline{\eta} \right) \overline{u}_x \overline{u}_x + S_{xx} + \frac12 \rho g (h+\overline{\eta})^2 \right]
+ \frac{\partial}{\partial y}
\left[ \rho \left( h + \overline{\eta} \right) \overline{u}_x \overline{u}_y + S_{xy} \right]
\\
&= \rho g \left( h + \overline{\eta} \right) \frac{\partial}{\partial x} h
+ \tau_{w,x} - \tau_{b,x},
\\
\frac{\partial}{\partial t}\left[ \rho \left( h + \overline{\eta} \right) \overline{u}_y \right]
&+ \frac{\partial}{\partial x}
\left[ \rho \left( h + \overline{\eta} \right) \overline{u}_y \overline{u}_x + S_{yx} \right]
+ \frac{\partial}{\partial y}
\left[ \rho \left( h + \overline{\eta} \right) \overline{u}_y \overline{u}_y + S_{yy} + \frac12 \rho g (h+\overline{\eta})^2 \right]
\\
&= \rho g \left( h + \overline{\eta} \right) \frac{\partial}{\partial y} h
+ \tau_{w,y} - \tau_{b,y}.
\end{align}$$

=== Energy conservation ===
For an inviscid flow the mean mechanical energy of the total flow – that is the sum of the energy of the mean flow and the fluctuating motion – is conserved. However, the mean energy of the fluctuating motion itself is not conserved, nor is the energy of the mean flow. The mean energy E of the fluctuating motion (the sum of the kinetic and potential energies satisfies:

$$\frac{\partial E}{\partial t} + \nabla \cdot \left[ \left( \overline{\boldsymbol{u}} + \boldsymbol{c}_g \right) E \right] + \mathbf{S}:\left( \nabla \otimes \overline{\boldsymbol{u}} \right) = \boldsymbol{\tau}_w \cdot \overline{\boldsymbol{u}} - \boldsymbol{\tau}_b \cdot \overline{\boldsymbol{u}} - \varepsilon,$$

where ":" denotes the double-dot product, and ε denotes the dissipation of mean mechanical energy (for instance by wave breaking). The term $\mathbf{S}:\left( \nabla \otimes \overline{\boldsymbol{u}} \right)$ is the exchange of energy with the mean motion, due to wave–current interaction. The mean horizontal wave-energy transport (u̅ + c_{g}) E consists of two contributions:

- u̅ E : the transport of wave energy by the mean flow, and
- c_{g} E : the mean energy transport by the waves themselves, with the group velocity c_{g} as the wave-energy transport velocity.

In a Cartesian coordinate system, the above equation for the mean energy E of the flow fluctuations becomes:

$$\begin{align}
\frac{\partial E}{\partial t}
&+ \frac{\partial}{\partial x} \left[ \left( \overline{u}_x + c_{g,x} \right) E \right]
+ \frac{\partial}{\partial y} \left[ \left( \overline{u}_y + c_{g,y} \right) E \right]
\\
&+ S_{xx}        \frac{\partial \overline{u}_x}{\partial x}
+ S_{xy} \left( \frac{\partial \overline{u}_y}{\partial x} + \frac{\partial \overline{u}_x}{\partial y} \right)
+ S_{yy}        \frac{\partial \overline{u}_y}{\partial y}
\\
&= \left( \tau_{w,x} - \tau_{b,x} \right) \overline{u}_x
+ \left( \tau_{w,y} - \tau_{b,y} \right) \overline{u}_y
- \varepsilon.
\end{align}$$

So the radiation stress changes the wave energy E only in case of a spatial-inhomogeneous current field (u̅_{x},u̅_{y}).
