= Langmuir turbulence =

Turbulent flow with coherent Langmuir circulation structures

In fluid dynamics, and oceanography, Langmuir turbulence is a turbulent flow with coherent Langmuir circulation structures that exist and evolve over a range of spatial and temporal scales. These structures arise through an interaction between the ocean surface waves and the currents.

In the upper ocean Langmuir circulations are a special case where the turbulent structures exhibit a dominant cell size. In general it is expected that Langmuir turbulence is a global ocean phenomenon and not confined to gentle wind conditions or shallow water ways (as with most observations of Langmuir circulation).

An important consequence of the Langmuir turbulence are deeply penetrating jets. These features occur between counter-rotating Langmuir circulations and can inject turbulent kinetic energy to depths well below the depth scale for the surface waves (Stokes drift depth scale). Langmuir turbulence could have an important impact on our understanding of climate. In particular, Langmuir turbulence could affect the global ocean's sea surface temperature as the deeply penetrating Langmuir jets modify the depth of the ocean mixed layer.

== See also ==
- Coriolis–Stokes force
