= Wave–current interaction =

Interaction between surface gravity waves and a mean flow

In fluid dynamics, wave–current interaction is the interaction between surface gravity waves and a mean flow. The interaction implies an exchange of energy, so after the start of the interaction both the waves and the mean flow are affected.

For depth-integrated and phase-averaged flows, the quantity of primary importance for the dynamics of the interaction is the wave radiation stress tensor.

Wave–current interaction is also one of the possible mechanisms for the occurrence of rogue waves, such as in the Agulhas Current. When a wave group encounters an opposing current, the waves in the group may pile up on top of each other which will propagate into a rogue wave.

== Classification ==
Peregrine (1976) identifies five major sub-classes within wave–current interaction:

- interaction of waves with a large-scale current field, with slow – as compared to the wavelength – two-dimensional horizontal variations of the current fields;
- interaction of waves with small-scale current changes (in contrast with the case above), where the horizontal current varies suddenly, over a length scale comparable with the wavelength;
- the combined wave–current motion for currents varying (strongly) with depth below the free surface;
- interaction of waves with turbulence; and
- interaction of ship waves and currents, such as in the ship's wake.

== See also ==
- generalized Lagrangian mean
- rip current
