= Langmuir circulation =

Vortices at the ocean's surface

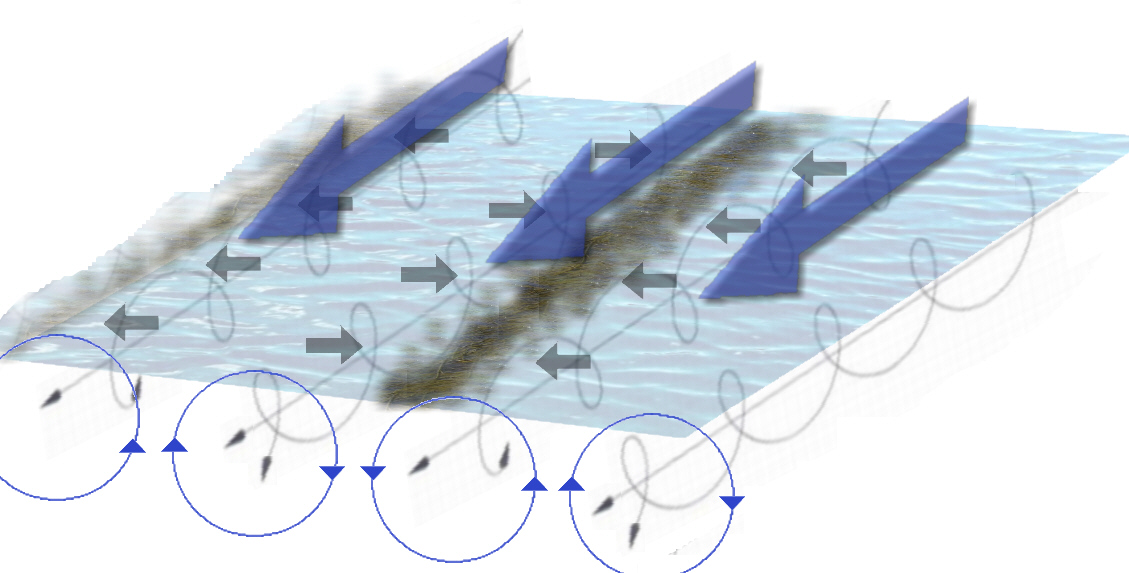
Langmuir circulation

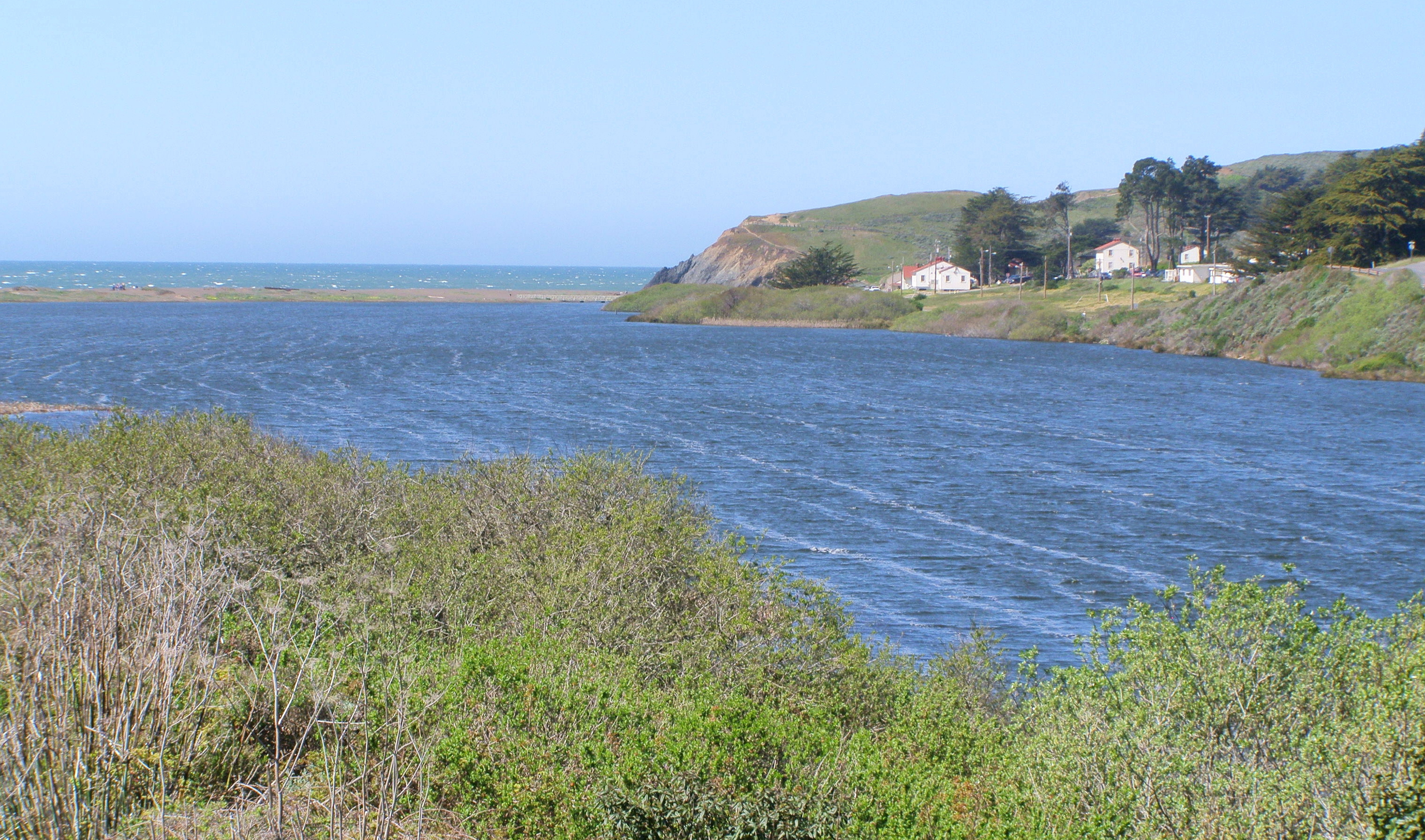
White streaks in this lagoon are due to the Langmuir circulation.

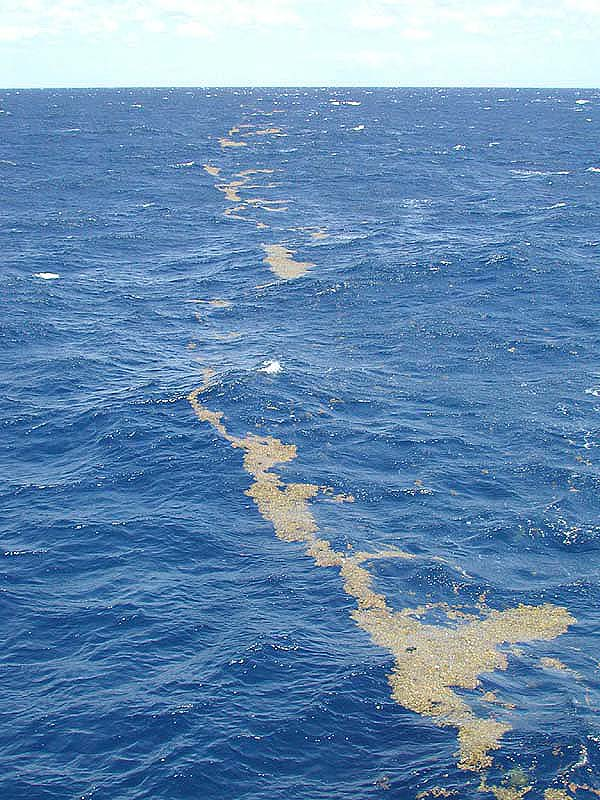
These lines of sargassum can stretch for miles along the surface. The clumps of floating algae are often concentrated by the strong winds and wave action associated with the Gulf Stream.

In physical oceanography, Langmuir circulation consists of a series of shallow, slow, counter-rotating vortices at the ocean's surface aligned with the wind. These circulations are developed when wind blows steadily over the sea surface. Irving Langmuir discovered this phenomenon after observing windrows of seaweed in the Sargasso Sea in 1927. Langmuir circulations circulate within the mixed layer; however, it is not yet so clear how strongly they can cause mixing at the base of the mixed layer.

== Theory ==
The driving force of these circulations is an interaction of the mean flow with wave averaged flows of the surface waves. Stokes drift velocity of the waves stretches and tilts the vorticity of the flow near the surface. The production of vorticity in the upper ocean is balanced by downward (often turbulent) diffusion $\nu_T$. For a flow driven by a wind $\tau$ characterized by friction velocity $u_*$ the ratio of vorticity diffusion and production defines the Langmuir number
$$\mathrm{La} = \sqrt{\frac{\nu^3_Tk^6}{\sigma a^2u^2_*k^4}}
~ \text{ or } ~
\sqrt{\frac{\nu_T^3\beta^6}{u^2_*S_0\beta^3}}$$
where the first definition is for a monochromatic wave field of amplitude $a$, frequency $\sigma$, and wavenumber $k$ and the second uses a generic inverse length scale $\beta$, and Stokes velocity scale $S_0$. This is exemplified by the Craik–Leibovich equations which are an approximation of the Lagrangian mean. In the Boussinesq approximation the governing equations can be written
$$\frac{\partial u_i}{\partial t}+u_j \, \nabla_ju_i = -2\varepsilon_{ijk}\Omega_j(u^s_k+u_k) - \nabla_i\left(\frac{P}{\rho_0}+\frac{1}{2}u^s_ju^s_j+u^s_ju_j\right) +\varepsilon_{ijk} u^s_j \varepsilon_{k\ell m} \, \nabla_\ell u_m+g_i\frac{\rho}{\rho_0}+\nabla_j\nu \, \nabla_ju_i$$
$$\nabla_i u_i = 0$$
$$\frac{\partial \rho}{\partial t} + u_j \, \nabla_j\rho = \nabla_i\kappa \, \nabla_i\rho$$
where

- $u_i$ is the fluid velocity,
- $\Omega$ is planetary rotation,
- $u^s_i$ is the Stokes drift velocity of the surface wave field,
- $P$ is the pressure,
- $g_i$ is the acceleration due to gravity,
- $\rho$ is the density,
- $\rho_0$ is the reference density,
- $\nu$ is the viscosity, and
- $\kappa$ is the diffusivity.

In the open ocean conditions where there may not be a dominant length scale controlling the scale of the Langmuir cells the concept of Langmuir Turbulence is advanced.

== Observations ==
The circulation has been observed to be between 0°–20° to the right of the wind in the Northern Hemisphere and the helix forming bands of divergence and convergence at the surface. At the convergence zones, there are commonly concentrations of floating seaweed, foam and debris along these bands. Along these divergent zones, the ocean surface is typically clear of debris since diverging currents force material out of this zone and into adjacent converging zones. At the surface the circulation will set a current from the divergence zone to the convergence zone and the spacing between these zones are of the order of 1–300 m (3–1,000 ft). Below convergence zones narrow jets of downward flow form and the magnitude of the current will be comparable to the horizontal flow. The downward propagation will typically be in the order of meters or tenths of meters and will not penetrate the pycnocline. The upwelling is less intense and takes place over a wider band under the divergence zone. In wind speeds ranging from 2–12 m/s (6.6–39.4 ft/s) the maximum vertical velocity ranged from 2–10 cm/s (0.79–3.94 in/s) with a ratio of down-welling to wind velocities ranging from −0.0025 to −0.0085.

== Biological effects ==
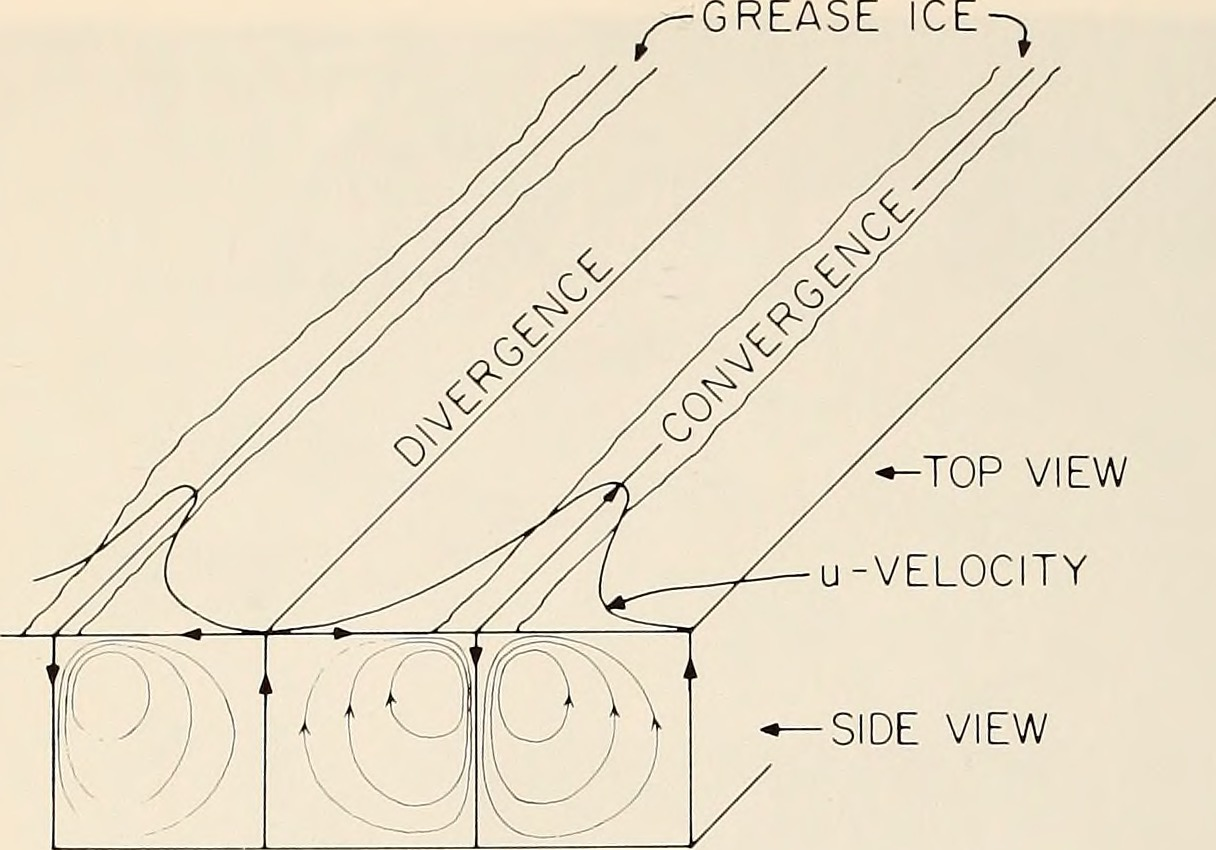
Higher windward velocity in convergent zones of Langmuir cells

Langmuir circulations (LCs), which are counter-rotating cylindrical roll vortices in the upper ocean, have significant role in vertical mixing. Though they are transient and their strength as well as direction depend on wind and wave properties, they facilitate mixing of nutrients and affect the distribution of marine organisms like plankton in the upper mixed layer of ocean. The wind-generated roll vortices create regions where organisms of different buoyancy, orientation and swimming behavior can aggregate, resulting in patchiness. Indeed, LC can produce significant aggregation of algae during events like red tide. Theoretically, LC size increases with the wind speed unless limited by density discontinuities by pycnocline. But the visibility of surface effects of LC could be limited by the breaking waves during strong winds that disperse the materials present at the surface. So, the surface effects of LC are more likely to be visible during winds stronger than critical wind speed of 3 m/s but not too strong.

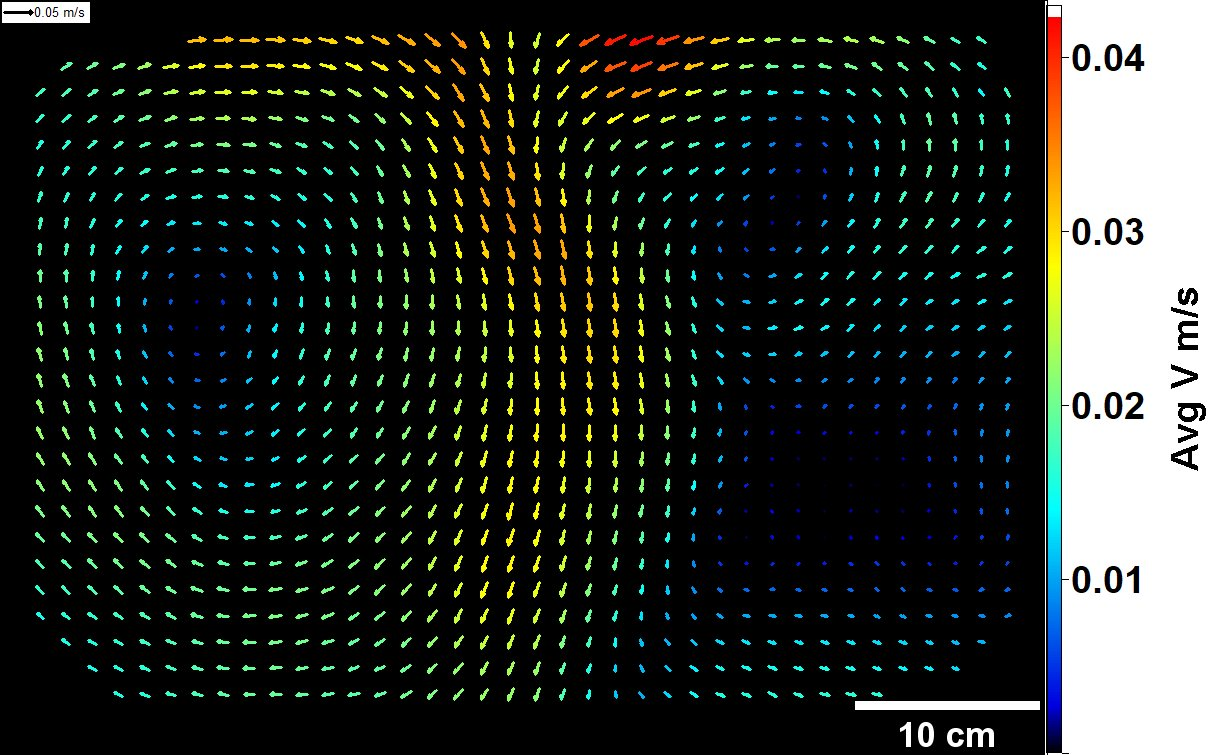
PIV vectors of counter rotating vortices

Moreover, previous studies have shown that organisms and materials can aggregate at different regions within LC like downwelling current in convergent zone, upwelling current in divergent zone, retention zone in LC vortex and region between upwelling and downwelling zones. Similarly, LC are found to have higher windward surface current in convergent zones due to jet like flow. This faster moving convergent region in water surface can enhance the transport of organisms and materials in the direction of wind.

=== Effect on plants ===
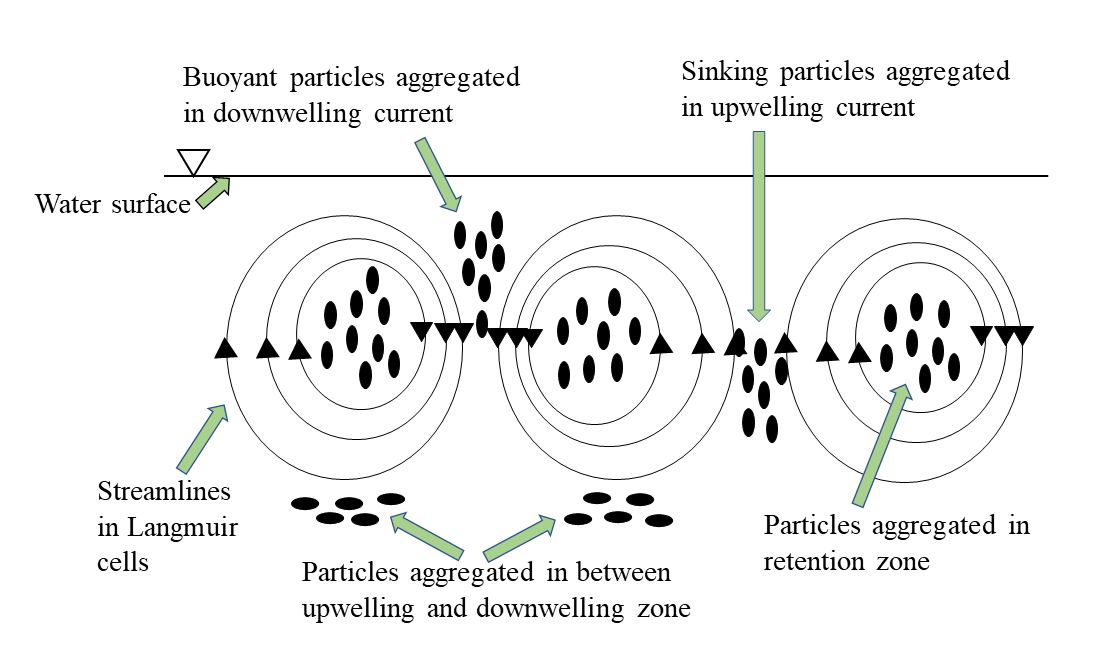
Distribution of particles within Langmuir cells

In 1927, Langmuir saw the organized rows of Sargassum natans while crossing the Sargasso Sea in the Atlantic Ocean. Unlike active swimmers like animals and zooplankton, plants and phytoplankton are usually passive bodies in water and their aggregation are determined by the flow behavior. In windrows, concentrated planktonic organisms color the water and indicate the presence of LC. There has been observation of greater variability in plankton tows collected along the wind direction than samples collected perpendicular to the wind. And one of the reason for such variation could be due to LC that results convergence (high sample) or in between (low sample) zones in alongwind tow. Similarly, such converging effect of LC has also been observed as high chlorophyll zone at about 100 m in Lake Tahoe which could be due to oblique towing through LC. In addition, Sargassum get carried from surface to benthos in downwelling zone of LC and can lose buoyancy after sinking at depth for enough time. Some of the plants that are usually observed floating in water could get submerged during high wind conditions due to downwelling current of LC. Besides, LC could also lead to patchiness of positively buoyant dinoflagellates (including toxic red tide organisms) during blooms. Moreover, the negatively buoyant phytoplankters which would sink slowly in still water has been observed to get retained in euphotic zone which may be due to suspension created by vertical convection cells.

Furthermore, a broader study on the Langmuir supercells in which the circulation can reach the seafloor observed the aggregation of macroalgae Colpomenia sp. in the sea floor of shallow waters (~5 m) in Great Bahama Bank due to local wind speed of around 8 to 13 m/s. Such LC could be responsible for transport of carbon biomass from shallow water to deep sea. This effect was evident as the concentration of the algae were found to reduce dramatically after the occurrence of LC as observed from ocean color satellite imagery (NASA) during the period of the study. Such aggregation of negatively buoyant macroalgae on sea floor is similar to windrows of positively buoyant particles on water surface due to LC.

=== Effect on animals ===
While plants have passive reaction to LC, animals can react to both the LC, presence of plant/food aggregation and light. One of such observation was the adaptation of Physalia to windrows containing entangling Sargassum. Physalia tend to drift across the windrows which also increased food or zooplankter availability in divergent zones.

Moreover, studies in Lake Mendota have shown good correlation between Daphnia pulex concentration and the appearance of foam lines. Similarly, significant differences were observed in catches of Daphnia hyaline when sampling in and out of foamlines in South Wales lake, with greater number appearing in divergent zone. Such distribution of particles and animals can be described using mathematical model developed by Stommel that suggested area of retention on upwelling zone for sinking particles and on downwelling zone for positively buoyant particles. Actually, the zooplankton could become trapped in upwelling zones to a point where animals are stimulated to swim downwards. A more detailed model was later developed by Stavn describing the zooplankton aggregation where the animal orientation, dorsal light reaction and current velocity determined their region of concentration in either downwelling (due to slow current), upwelling (due to high current) and in between latter two zones (due to intermediate currents). There has been further improvement in such models like the modification of Stommel's model by Titman & Kilham in order to consider the difference in maximum downwelling and upwelling velocities and by Evans & Taylor that discussed the instability of Stommel's regions due to varying swimming speed with depth which produced spiral trajectories affecting accumulation region.

Nevertheless, high concentration of planktonic organisms within LC can attract birds and fish. Schools of White Bass Roccus chrysops were observed feeding upon Daphnia along the foam track. In contrast, lesser Flamingoes Phoeniconaias minor were observed feeding on bubble lines containing concentrated blue-green algae. Similarly, medusae were found to aggregate in linear pattern (average spacing of 129 m) parallel with wind in the Bering Sea which could be due to large LCs. Such aggregation can affect the feeding and predation of medusae.

=== Effect on surface tension ===
High concentration of surfactants (surface-active substances) produced by phytoplanktons can result higher Marangoni stress in converging regions in LC. Numerical simulation suggest that such Marangoni stress due to surfactant can increase the size of vortical structures, vertical velocity and remixing of water and biological/chemical components in the local region compared to that without surfactant.

Finally, more theoretical and experimental investigations are needed to confirm the significance of LC.
