= Hendrik Tolman =

Dutch-American scientist

Hendrik Lieuwe Tolman (born 16 January 1961, in Leeuwarden) is the original developer of the WAVEWATCH III wind wave model.

Tolman studied civil engineering at Delft University of Technology in The Netherlands, where he wrote in 1985 his master thesis under de guidance of prof. Jurjen Battjes on the design of a measurement platform in the surf zone.

He has been the branch chief for the Marine Modeling and Analysis Branch in the US National Weather Service of NOAA since 2007, having joined the branch in 1992.
