= Coriolis–Stokes force =

Concept in fluid dynamics

In fluid dynamics, the Coriolis–Stokes force is a forcing of the mean flow in a rotating fluid due to interaction of the Coriolis effect and wave-induced Stokes drift. This force acts on water independently of the wind stress.

This force is named after Gaspard-Gustave Coriolis and George Gabriel Stokes, two nineteenth-century scientists. Important initial studies into the effects of the Earth's rotation on the wave motion – and the resulting forcing effects on the mean ocean circulation – were done by Ursell & Deacon (1950), Hasselmann (1970) and Pollard (1970).

The Coriolis–Stokes forcing on the mean circulation in an Eulerian reference frame was first given by Hasselmann (1970):

$$\rho\boldsymbol{f}\times\boldsymbol{u}_S,$$

to be added to the common Coriolis forcing $\rho\boldsymbol{f}\times\boldsymbol{u}.$ Here $\boldsymbol{u}$ is the mean flow velocity in an Eulerian reference frame and $\boldsymbol{u}_S$ is the Stokes drift velocity – provided both are horizontal velocities (perpendicular to $\hat{\boldsymbol{z}}$). Further $\rho$ is the fluid density, $\times$ is the cross product operator, $\boldsymbol{f}=f\hat{\boldsymbol{z}}$ where $f=2\Omega\sin\phi$ is the Coriolis parameter (with $\Omega$ the Earth's rotation angular speed and $\sin\phi$ the sine of the latitude) and $\hat{\boldsymbol{z}}$ is the unit vector in the vertical upward direction (opposing the Earth's gravity).

Since the Stokes drift velocity $\boldsymbol{u}_S$ is in the wave propagation direction, and $\boldsymbol{f}$ is in the vertical direction, the Coriolis–Stokes forcing is perpendicular to the wave propagation direction (i.e. in the direction parallel to the wave crests). In deep water the Stokes drift velocity is $\boldsymbol{u}_S=\boldsymbol{c}\,(ka)^2\exp(2kz)$ with $\boldsymbol{c}$ the wave's phase velocity, $k$ the wavenumber, $a$ the wave amplitude and $z$ the vertical coordinate (positive in the upward direction opposing the gravitational acceleration).

== See also ==
- Ekman layer
- Ekman transport
