= Significant wave height =

Mean wave height of the highest third of the waves

In physical oceanography, the significant wave height (SWH, HTSGW or H_{s}) is defined traditionally as the mean wave height (trough to crest) of the highest third of the waves (H_{1/3}). It is usually defined as four times the standard deviation of the surface elevation – or equivalently as four times the square root of the zeroth-order moment (area) of the wave spectrum. The symbol H_{m0} is usually used for that latter definition. The significant wave height (H_{s}) may thus refer to H_{m0} or H_{1/3}; the difference in magnitude between the two definitions is only a few percent. SWH is used to characterize sea state, including winds and swell.

== Origin and definition ==
The original definition resulted from work by the oceanographer Walter Munk during World War II. The significant wave height was intended to mathematically express the height estimated by a "trained observer". It is commonly used as a measure of the height of ocean waves.

=== Time domain definition ===
Significant wave height H_{1/3}, or H_{s} or H_{sig}, as determined in the time domain, directly from the time series of the surface elevation, is defined as the average height of that one-third of the N measured waves having the greatest heights:
$$H_{1/3} = \frac{1}{\frac13\,N}\, \sum_{m=1}^{\frac13\,N}\, H_m$$
where H_{m} represents the individual wave heights, sorted into descending order of height as m increases from 1 to N. Only the highest one-third is used, since this corresponds best with visual observations of experienced mariners, whose vision apparently focuses on the higher waves.

=== Frequency domain definition ===
Significant wave height H_{m0}, defined in the frequency domain, is used both for measured and forecasted wave variance spectra. Most easily, it is defined in terms of the variance m_{0} or standard deviation σ_{η} of the surface elevation:
$$H_{m_0} = 4 \sqrt{m_0} = 4 \sigma_\eta,$$
where m_{0}, the zeroth-moment of the variance spectrum, is obtained by integration of the variance spectrum. In case of a measurement, the standard deviation σ_{η} is the easiest and most accurate statistic to be used.

== Statistical distribution of the heights of individual waves ==
Statistical distribution of ocean wave heights

Significant wave height, scientifically represented as H_{s} or H_{sig}, is an important parameter for the statistical distribution of ocean waves. The most common waves are lower in height than H_{s}, so significant waves do not occur constantly. In addition, many waves are higher than the significant wave.

Generally, the statistical distribution of the individual wave heights is well approximated by a Rayleigh distribution. For example, given that H_{s} is 10 metres (33 feet), statistically:

- 1 in 10 will be larger than 10.7 metres (35 ft)
- 1 in 100 will be larger than 15.1 metres (50 ft)
- 1 in 1000 will be larger than 18.6 metres (61 ft)

This implies that one might encounter a wave that is roughly double the significant wave height. However, in rapidly changing conditions, the disparity between the significant wave height and the largest individual waves might be even larger.

=== Other statistics ===
Other statistical measures of the wave height are also widely used. The RMS wave height, which is defined as square root of the average of the squares of all wave heights, is approximately equal to H_{s} divided by 1.4.

For example, according to the Irish Marine Institute:

… at midnight on 9/12/2007 a record significant wave height was recorded of 17.2m at with [sic] a period of 14 seconds.

== Measurement ==
Although most measuring devices estimate the significant wave height from a wave spectrum, satellite radar altimeters are unique in measuring directly the significant wave height thanks to the different time of return from wave crests and troughs within the area illuminated by the radar. The maximum ever measured wave height from a satellite is 20.1 metres (66 ft) during a North Atlantic storm in 2011.

== Weather forecasts ==
NOAA Wavewatch III model animation of significant wave height forecasts in the Pacific.

The World Meteorological Organization stipulates that certain countries are responsible for providing weather forecasts for the world's oceans. These respective countries' meteorological offices are called Regional Specialized Meteorological Centers, or RSMCs. In their weather products, they give ocean wave height forecasts in significant wave height. In the United States, NOAA's National Weather Service is the RSMC for a portion of the North Atlantic, and a portion of the North Pacific. The Ocean Prediction Center and the Tropical Prediction Center's Tropical Analysis and Forecast Branch (TAFB) issue these forecasts.

RSMCs use wind-wave models as tools to help predict the sea conditions. In the U.S., NOAA's Wavewatch III model is used heavily.

== Generalization to wave systems ==
A significant wave height is also defined similarly, from the wave spectrum, for the different systems that make up the sea. We then have a significant wave height for the wind-sea or for a particular swell.

== See also ==
- Ocean Prediction Center
- Rogue wave – a wave of over twice the significant wave height
- Sea state
