= Mean flow =

In fluid dynamics, the fluid flow is often decomposed into a mean flow and deviations from the mean. The averaging can be done either in space or in time, or by ensemble averaging.

== Example ==
Calculation of the mean flow may often be as simple as the mathematical mean: simply add up the given flow rates and then divide the final figure by the number of initial readings.

For example, given two discharges (Q) of 3 m³/s and 5 m³/s, we can use these flow rates Q to calculate the mean flow rate Q_{mean}. Which in this case is Q_{mean} = 4 m³/s.

== See also ==
- Generalized Lagrangian mean
