= History of fluid mechanics =

Pioneers of fluid mechanics

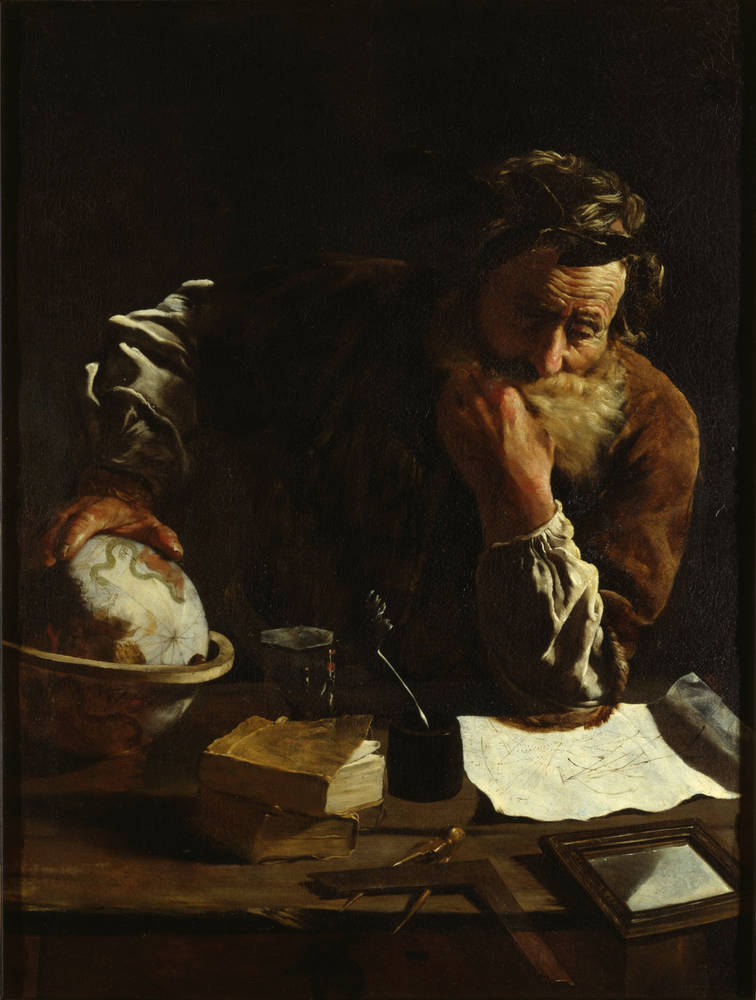
Archimedes

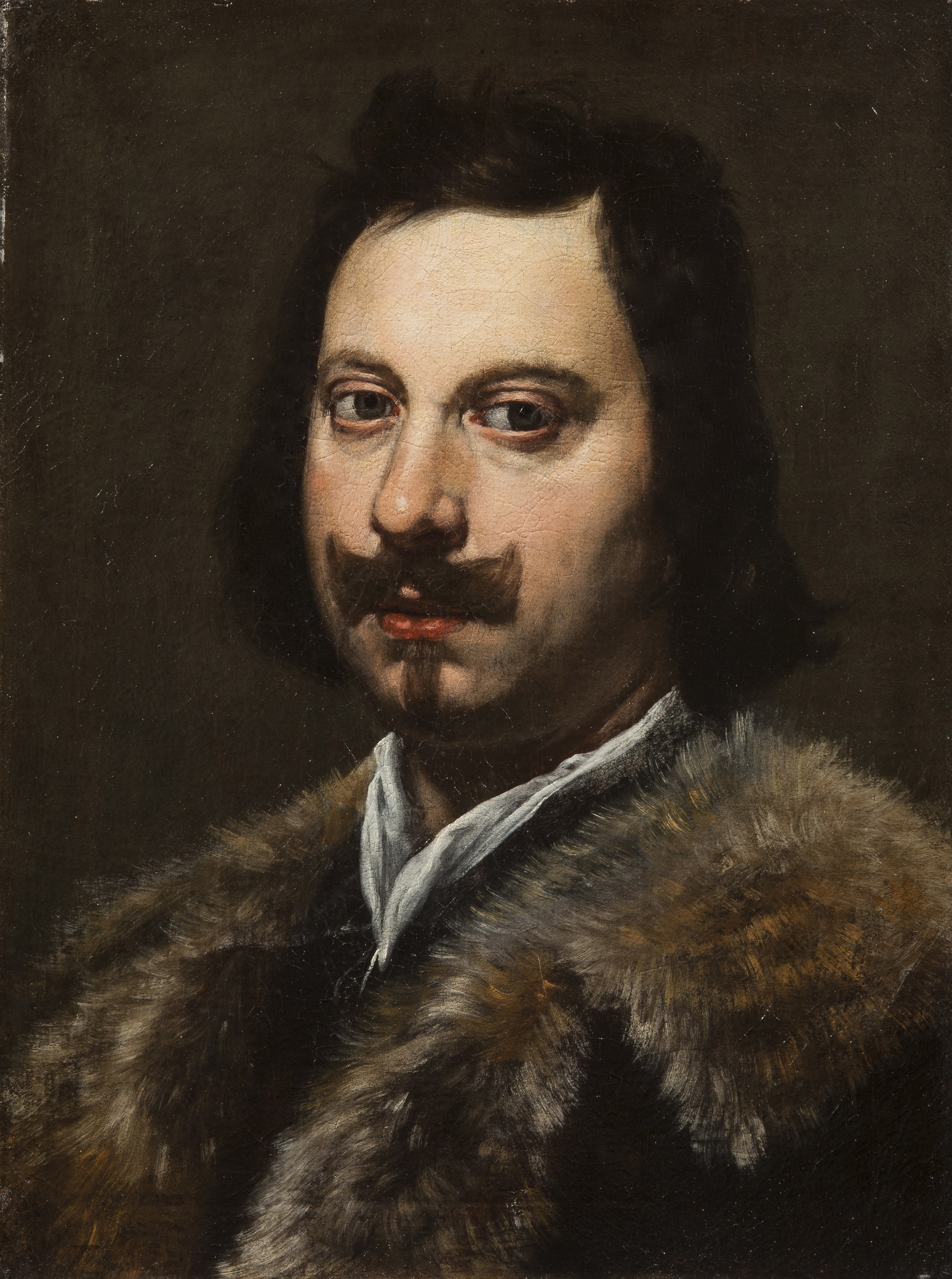
Evangelista Torricelli

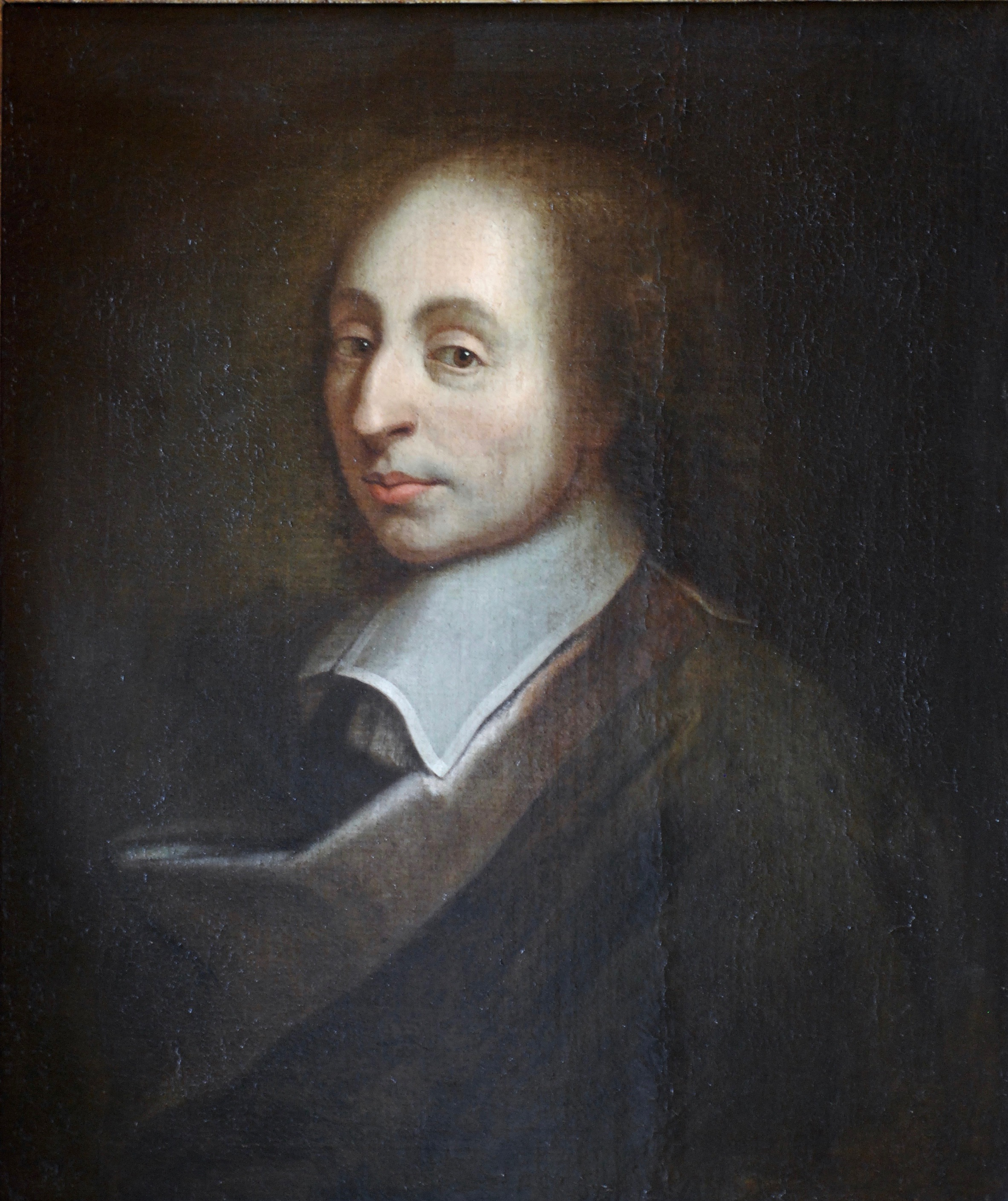
Blaise Pascal

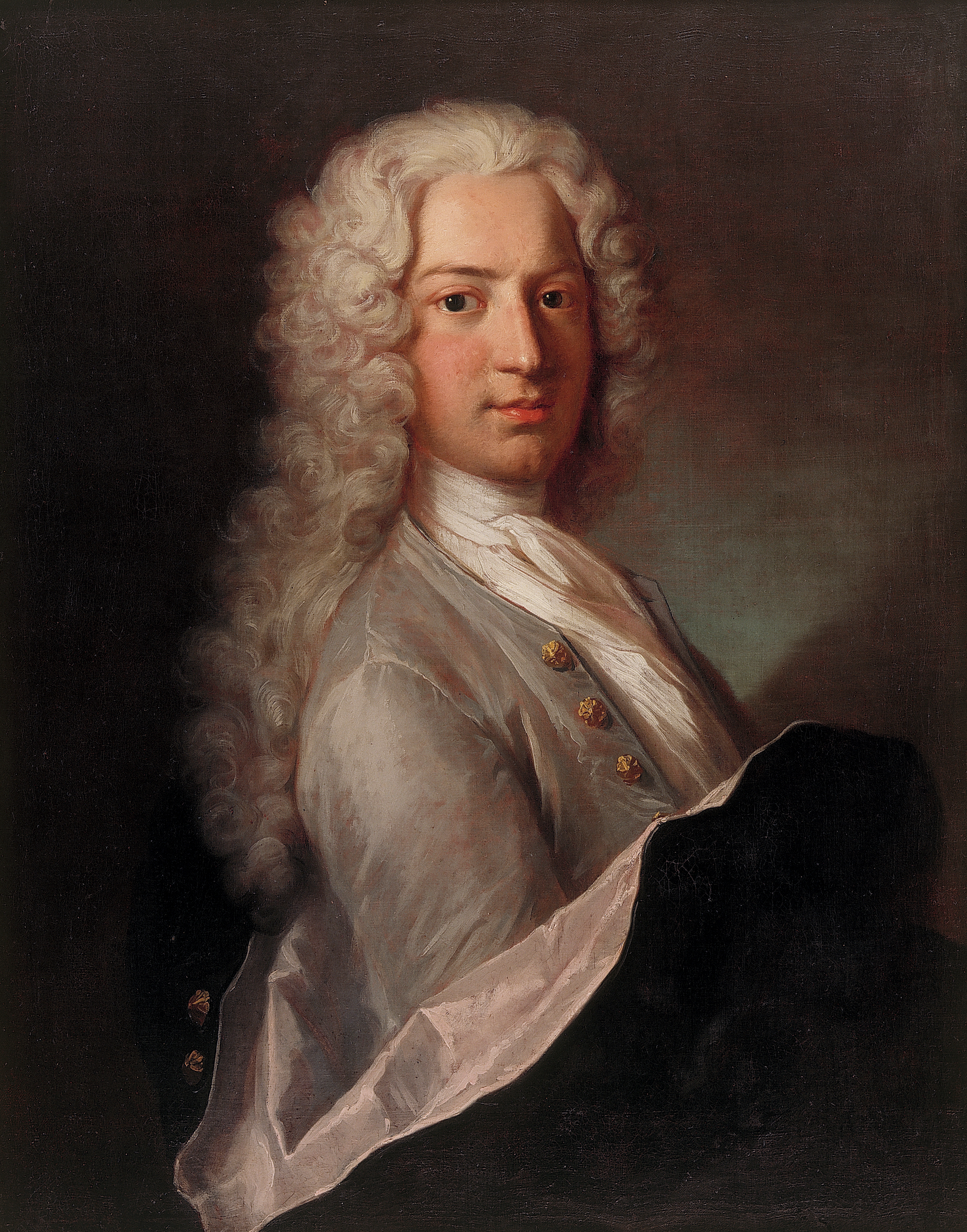
Daniel Bernoulli

The history of fluid mechanics is a fundamental strand of the history of physics and engineering. The study of the movement of fluids (liquids and gases) and the forces that act upon them dates back to pre-history. The field has undergone a continuous evolution, driven by human dependence on water, meteorological conditions, and internal biological processes.

The success of early civilizations, can be attributed to developments in the understanding of water dynamics, allowing for the construction of canals and aqueducts for water distribution and farm irrigation, as well as maritime transport. Due to its conceptual complexity, most discoveries in this field relied almost entirely on experiments, at least until the development of advanced understanding of differential equations and computational methods. Significant theoretical contributions were made by notables figures like Archimedes, Johann Bernoulli and his son Daniel Bernoulli, Leonhard Euler, Claude-Louis Navier and George Stokes, who developed the fundamental equations to describe fluid mechanics. Advancements in experimentation and computational methods have further propelled the field, leading to practical applications in more specialized industries ranging from aerospace to environmental engineering. Fluid mechanics has also been important for the study of astronomical bodies and the dynamics of galaxies.

== Antiquity ==
=== Pre-history ===
A pragmatic, if not scientific, knowledge of fluid flow was exhibited by ancient civilizations, such as in the design of arrows, spears, boats, and particularly hydraulic engineering projects for flood protection, irrigation, drainage, and water supply. The earliest human civilizations began near the shores of rivers, and consequently coincided with the dawn of hydrology, hydraulics, and hydraulic engineering.

=== Buoyancy ===
Observations of specific gravity and buoyancy were recorded by ancient Chinese philosophers. In the 4th century BCE Mencius describes the weight of the gold is equivalent to the feathers. In 3rd century CE, Cao Chong describes the story of weighing the elephant by observing displacement of the boats loaded with different weights.

The forces at work in buoyancy as discovered by Archimedes. Note that the object is floating because the upward force of buoyancy is equal to the downward force of gravity.

The fundamental principles of hydrostatics and dynamics were given by Archimedes in his work On Floating Bodies, around 250 BC. In it, Archimedes develops the law of buoyancy, also known as Archimedes' principle. This principle states that a body immersed in a fluid experiences a buoyant force equal to the weight of the fluid it displaces. Archimedes maintained that each particle of a fluid mass, when in equilibrium, is equally pressed in every direction; and he inquired into the conditions according to which a solid body floating in a fluid should assume and preserve a position of equilibrium.

=== Greco-Roman engineering ===
In the Greek school at Alexandria, which flourished under the auspices of the Ptolemies, attempts were made at the construction of hydraulic machinery, and about 120 BC the fountain of compression, the siphon, and the forcing-pump were invented by Ctesibius and Hero. The siphon is a simple instrument; but the forcing-pump is a complicated invention, which could scarcely have been expected in the infancy of hydraulics. It was probably suggested to Ctesibius by the Egyptian wheel or Noria, which was common at that time, and which was a kind of chain pump, consisting of a number of earthen pots carried round by a wheel. In some of these machines the pots have a valve in the bottom which enables them to descend without much resistance, and diminishes greatly the load upon the wheel; and, if we suppose that this valve was introduced so early as the time of Ctesibius, it is not difficult to perceive how such a machine might have led to the invention of the forcing-pump.

Notwithstanding these inventions of the Alexandrian school, its attention does not seem to have been directed to the motion of fluids; and the first attempt to investigate this subject was made by Sextus Julius Frontinus, inspector of the public fountains at Rome in the reigns of Nerva and Trajan. In his work De aquaeductibus urbis Romae commentarius, he considers the methods which were at that time employed for ascertaining the quantity of water discharged from ajutages (tubes), and the mode of distributing the waters of an aqueduct or a fountain. He remarked that the flow of water from an orifice depends not only on the magnitude of the orifice itself, but also on the height of the water in the reservoir; and that a pipe employed to carry off a portion of water from an aqueduct should, as circumstances required, have a position more or less inclined to the original direction of the current. But as he was unacquainted with the law of the velocities of running water as depending upon the depth of the orifice, the want of precision which appears in his results is not surprising.

== Middle Ages ==
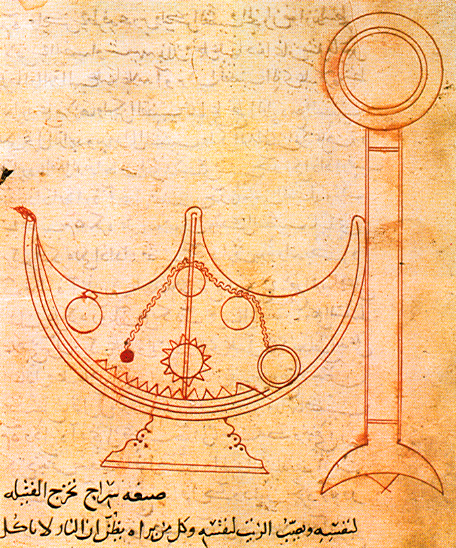
Description of a self trimming lamp from 9th century, discussed in the treatise by the Banū Mūsā brothers.

=== Islamicate physicists ===
Islamicate scientists, particularly Abu Rayhan Biruni (973–1048) and later Al-Khazini (fl. 1115–1130), were the first to apply experimental scientific methods to fluid mechanics, especially in the field of fluid statics, such as for determining specific weights. They applied the mathematical theories of ratios and infinitesimal techniques, and introduced algebraic and fine calculation techniques into the field of fluid statics. Al-Khazini, in The Book of the Balance of Wisdom (1121), invented a hydrostatic balance.

During his experiments on fluid mechanics, Al-Biruni invented the conical measure.

=== Islamicate engineers ===
In the 9th century, Banū Mūsā brothers' Book of Ingenious Devices described a number of early automatic controls in fluid mechanics. Two-step level controls for fluids, an early form of discontinuous variable structure controls, was developed by the Banu Musa brothers. They also described an early feedback controller for fluids. According to Donald Routledge Hill, the Banu Musa brothers were "masters in the exploitation of small variations" in hydrostatic pressures and in using conical valves as "in-line" components in flow systems, "the first known use of conical valves as automatic controllers". They also described the use of other valves, including a plug valve, float valve and tap. The Banu Musa also developed an early fail-safe system where "one can withdraw small quantities of liquid repeatedly, but if one withdraws a large quantity, no further extractions are possible". The double-concentric siphon and the funnel with bent end for pouring in different liquids, neither of which appear in any earlier Greek works, were also original inventions by the Banu Musa brothers. Some of the other mechanisms they described include a float chamber and an early differential pressure.

In 1206, Al-Jazari's Book of Knowledge of Ingenious Mechanical Devices described many hydraulic machines. Of particular importance were his water-raising pumps. The first known use of a crankshaft in a chain pump was in one of al-Jazari's saqiya machines. The concept of minimizing intermittent working is also first implied in one of al-Jazari's saqiya chain pumps, which was for the purpose of maximising the efficiency of the saqiya chain pump. Al-Jazari also invented a twin-cylinder reciprocating piston suction pump, which included the first suction pipes, suction pumping, double-action pumping, and made early uses of valves and a crankshaft-connecting rod mechanism. This pump is remarkable for three reasons: the first known use of a true suction pipe (which sucks fluids into a partial vacuum) in a pump, the first application of the double-acting principle, and the conversion of rotary to reciprocating motion, via the crankshaft-connecting rod mechanism.

== Sixteenth century ==
During the Renaissance, Leonardo da Vinci was well known for his experimental skills. His notes provide precise depictions of various phenomena, including vessels, jets, hydraulic jumps, eddy formation, tides, as well as designs for both low drag (streamlined) and high drag (parachute) configurations. Da Vinci is also credited for formulating the conservation of mass in one-dimensional steady flow.

In 1586, the Flemish engineer and mathematician Simon Stevin published De Beghinselen des Waterwichts (Principles on the Weight of Water), a study of hydrostatics that, among other things, extensively discussed the hydrostatic paradox.

== Seventeenth century ==
Torricelli law established the speed and quantity of flow that exits a barrel..

=== Torricelli's law ===
Benedetto Castelli, and Evangelista Torricelli, two of the disciples of Galileo Galilei, applied the discoveries of their master to the science of hydrodynamics. In 1628 Castelli published a small work, Della misura dell' acque correnti, in which he satisfactorily explained several phenomena in the motion of fluids in rivers and canals; but he committed a great paralogism in supposing the velocity of the water proportional to the depth of the orifice below the surface of the vessel. Torricelli, observing that in a jet where the water rushed through a small ajutage it rose to nearly the same height with the reservoir from which it was supplied, imagined that it ought to move with the same velocity as if it had fallen through that height by the force of gravity, and hence he deduced the proposition that the velocities of liquids are as the square root of the head, apart from the resistance of the air and the friction of the orifice. Torricelli's law was published in 1643, at the end of his treatise De motu gravium projectorum, and it was confirmed by the experiments of Raffaello Magiotti on the quantities of water discharged from different ajutages under different pressures (1648).

=== Blaise Pascal ===
In the hands of Blaise Pascal hydrostatics assumed the dignity of a science, and in a treatise on the equilibrium of liquids (Sur l'équilibre des liqueurs), found among his manuscripts after his death and published in 1663, the laws of the equilibrium of liquids were demonstrated in the most simple manner, and amply confirmed by experiments.

=== Mariotte and Guglielmini ===
The theorem of Torricelli was employed by many succeeding writers, but particularly by Edme Mariotte (1620–1684), whose Traité du mouvement des eaux, published after his death in the year 1686, is founded on a great variety of well-conducted experiments on the motion of fluids, performed at Versailles and Chantilly. In the discussion of some points he committed considerable mistakes. Others he treated very superficially, and in none of his experiments apparently did he attend to the diminution of efflux arising from the contraction of the liquid vein, when the orifice is merely a perforation in a thin plate; but he appears to have been the first who attempted to ascribe the discrepancy between theory and experiment to the retardation of the water's velocity through friction. His contemporary Domenico Guglielmini (1655–1710), who was inspector of the rivers and canals at Bologna, had ascribed this diminution of velocity in rivers to transverse motions arising from inequalities in their bottom. But as Mariotte observed similar obstructions even in glass pipes where no transverse currents could exist, the cause assigned by Guglielmini seemed destitute of foundation. The French philosopher, therefore, regarded these obstructions as the effects of friction. He supposed that the filaments of water which graze along the sides of the pipe lose a portion of their velocity; that the contiguous filaments, having on this account a greater velocity, rub upon the former, and suffer a diminution of their celerity; and that the other filaments are affected with similar retardations proportional to their distance from the axis of the pipe. In this way the medium velocity of the current may be diminished, and consequently the quantity of water discharged in a given time must, from the effects of friction, be considerably less than that which is computed from theory.

== Eighteenth century ==
=== Studies by Isaac Newton ===
==== Friction and viscosity ====
Newtonian fluids are described by their reaction to shear forces, where the derivative of the horizontal velocity with respect to the vertical direction is proportional to the shear stress.

The effects of friction and viscosity in diminishing the velocity of running water were noticed in the Principia of Sir Isaac Newton, who threw much light upon several branches of hydromechanics. At a time when the Cartesian system of vortices universally prevailed, he found it necessary to investigate that hypothesis, and in the course of his investigations he showed that the velocity of any stratum of the vortex is an arithmetical mean between the velocities of the strata which enclose it; and from this it evidently follows that the velocity of a filament of water moving in a pipe is an arithmetical mean between the velocities of the filaments which surround it. Taking advantage of these results, French engineer Henri Pitot afterwards showed that the retardations arising from friction are inversely as the diameters of the pipes in which the fluid moves.

==== Orifices ====
The attention of Newton was also directed to the discharge of water from orifices in the bottom of vessels. He supposed a cylindrical vessel full of water to be perforated in its bottom with a small hole by which the water escaped, and the vessel to be supplied with water in such a manner that it always remained full at the same height. He then supposed this cylindrical column of water to be divided into two parts – the first, which he called the "cataract", being an hyperboloid generated by the revolution of an hyperbola of the fifth degree around the axis of the cylinder which should pass through the orifice, and the second the remainder of the water in the cylindrical vessel. He considered the horizontal strata of this hyperboloid as always in motion, while the remainder of the water was in a state of rest, and imagined that there was a kind of cataract in the middle of the fluid.

When the results of this theory were compared with the quantity of water actually discharged, Newton concluded that the velocity with which the water issued from the orifice was equal to that which a falling body would receive by descending through half the height of water in the reservoir. This conclusion, however, is absolutely irreconcilable with the known fact that jets of water rise nearly to the same height as their reservoirs, and Newton seems to have been aware of this objection. Accordingly, in the second edition of his Principia, which appeared in 1713, he reconsidered his theory. He had discovered a contraction in the vein of fluid (vena contracta) which issued from the orifice, and found that, at the distance of about a diameter of the aperture, the section of the vein was contracted in the subduplicate ratio of two to one. He regarded, therefore, the section of the contracted vein as the true orifice from which the discharge of water ought to be deduced, and the velocity of the effluent water as due to the whole height of water in the reservoir; and by this means his theory became more conformable to the results of experience, though still open to serious objections.

==== Waves ====
Newton was also the first to investigate the difficult subject of the motion of waves.

=== Bernoulli's principle ===
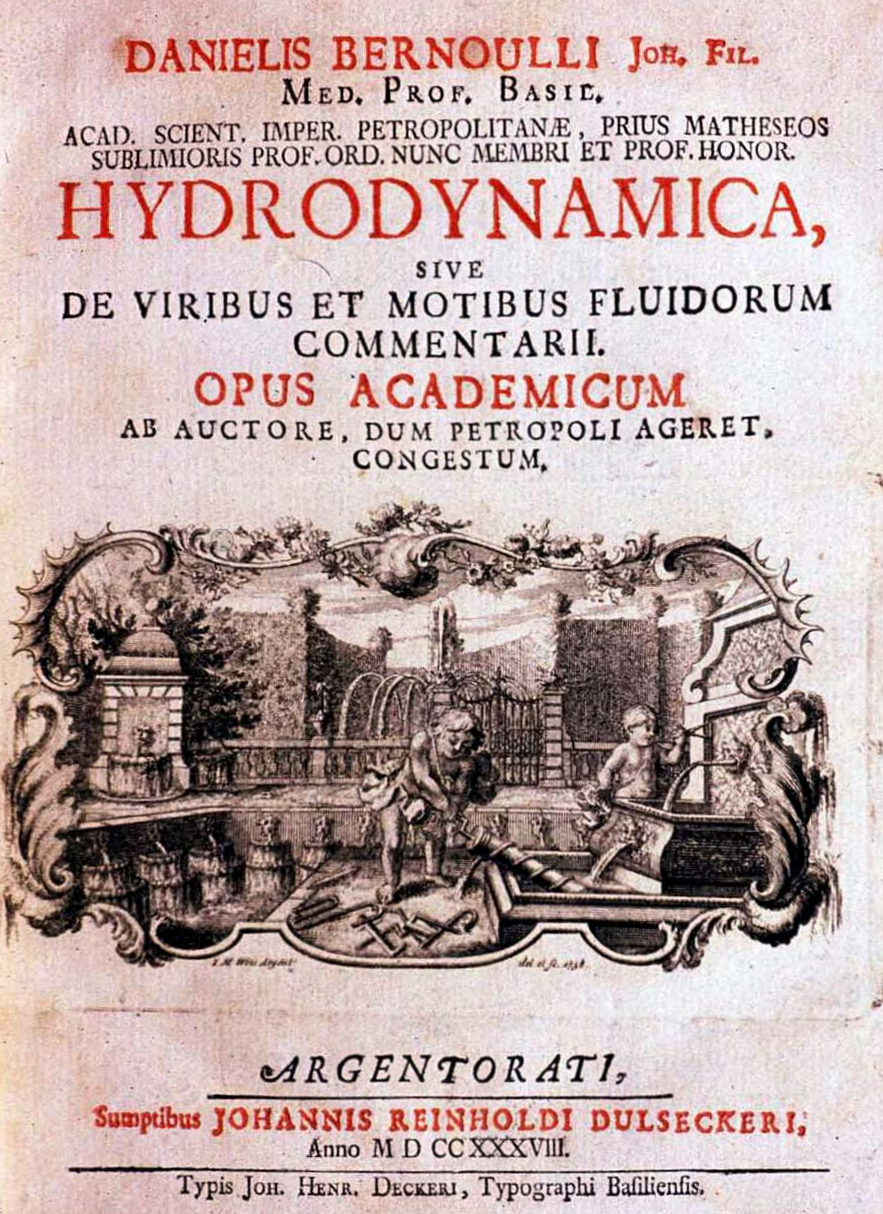
Front page of Daniel Bernoulli's Hydrodynamica, one of the first treatises on fluid dynamics. It introduced Bernoulli's principle.

In 1738 Daniel Bernoulli published his book Hydrodynamica. His theory of the motion of fluids, the germ of which was first published in his memoir entitled Theoria nova de motu aquarum per canales quocunque fluentes, communicated to the academy of St Petersburg as early as 1726, was founded on two suppositions, which appeared to him conformable to experience. He supposed that the surface of the fluid, contained in a vessel which is emptying itself by an orifice, remains always horizontal; and, if the fluid mass is conceived to be divided into an infinite number of horizontal strata of the same bulk, that these strata remain contiguous to each other, and that all their points descend vertically, with velocities inversely proportional to their breadth, or to the horizontal sections of the reservoir. In order to determine the motion of each stratum, he employed the principle of the conservatio virium vivarum, and obtained very elegant solutions.

But in the absence of a general demonstration of that principle, his results did not command the confidence which they would otherwise have deserved, and it became desirable to have a theory more certain, and depending solely on the fundamental laws of mechanics. Colin Maclaurin and John Bernoulli, who were of this opinion, resolved the problem by more direct methods, the one in his Fluxions, published in 1742, and the other in his Hydraulica nunc primum detecta, et demonstrata directe ex fundamentis pure mechanicis, which forms the fourth volume of his works. The method employed by Maclaurin has been thought not sufficiently rigorous; and that of John Bernoulli is, in the opinion of Joseph-Louis Lagrange, defective in clearness and precision.

=== d'Alembert principle ===
The theory of Daniel Bernoulli was opposed also by Jean le Rond d'Alembert. When generalizing the theory of pendulums of Jacob Bernoulli he discovered a principle of dynamics so simple and general that it reduced the laws of the motions of bodies to that of their equilibrium. He applied this principle to the motion of fluids, and gave a specimen of its application at the end of his Dynamics in 1743. It was more fully developed in his Traité des fluides, published in 1744, in which he gave simple and elegant solutions of problems relating to the equilibrium and motion of fluids. He made use of the same suppositions as Daniel Bernoulli, though his calculus was established in a very different manner. He considered, at every instant, the actual motion of a stratum as composed of a motion which it had in the preceding instant and of a motion which it had lost; and the laws of equilibrium between the motions lost furnished him with equations representing the motion of the fluid. It remained a desideratum to express by equations the motion of a particle of the fluid in any assigned direction. These equations were found by d'Alembert from two principles – that a rectangular canal, taken in a mass of fluid in equilibrium, is itself in equilibrium, and that a portion of the fluid, in passing from one place to another, preserves the same volume when the fluid is incompressible, or dilates itself according to a given law when the fluid is elastic. His ingenious method, published in 1752, in his Essai sur la résistance des fluides, was brought to perfection in his Opuscules mathématiques, and was adopted by Leonhard Euler.

=== Ideal fluid equation ===
Invisicid flow around a cylinder as described by Euler's equations.

The resolution of the questions concerning the motion of fluids was effected by means of Leonhard Euler's equations of fluid dynamics for ideal fluids. Differential equations were first applied to the motion of water by d'Alembert, and enabled both him and Euler to represent the theory of fluids in formulae restricted by no particular hypothesis.

The Euler equations first appeared in published form in Euler's article "Principes généraux du mouvement des fluides", published in Mémoires de l'Académie des Sciences de Berlin in 1757, although Euler had previously presented his work to the Berlin Academy in 1752. Prior work included contributions from the Bernoulli family as well as from Jean le Rond d'Alembert.

The Euler equations were among the first partial differential equations to be written down, after the wave equation. In Euler's original work, the system of equations consisted of the momentum and continuity equations, and thus was underdetermined except in the case of an incompressible flow.

=== Early works on fluid resistance ===
One of the most successful labourers in the science of hydrodynamics at this period was Pierre-Louis-Georges du Buat. Following in the steps of the Abbé Charles Bossut (Nouvelles Experiences sur la résistance des fluides, 1777), he published, in 1786, a revised edition of his Principes d'hydraulique, which contains a satisfactory theory of the motion of fluids, founded solely upon experiments. Dubuat considered that if water were a perfect fluid, and the channels in which it flowed infinitely smooth, its motion would be continually accelerated, like that of bodies descending in an inclined plane. But as the motion of rivers is not continually accelerated, and soon arrives at a state of uniformity, it is evident that the viscosity of the water, and the friction of the channel in which it descends, must equal the accelerating force. Dubuat, therefore, assumed it as a proposition of fundamental importance that, when water flows in any channel or bed, the accelerating force which obliges it to move is equal to the sum of all the resistances which it meets with, whether they arise from its own viscosity or from the friction of its bed. This principle was employed by him in the first edition of his work, which appeared in 1779. The theory contained in that edition was founded on the experiments of others, but he soon saw that a theory so new, and leading to results so different from the ordinary theory, should be founded on new experiments more direct than the former, and he was employed in the performance of these from 1780 to 1783. The experiments of Bossut were made only on pipes of a moderate declivity, but Dubuat used declivities of every kind, and made his experiments upon channels of various sizes.

== Nineteenth century ==
=== Navier–Stokes equations and viscous flow ===
Poiseuille flow: Water going through a cylindrical pipe goes faster near the center of the pipe than near its borders due to viscosity and friction in with the pipe walls.

In 1808, the French Academie des Sciences posed a prize for whoever could explain Ernst Chladni's experiment of vibrating plates. In 1820, Claude-Louis Navier proposed a Lagrangian approach of the problem. Although he did not win the prize, Navier continued his work in elasticity and in 1821, he derived results which were valid for more general elastic bodies. He then began work on generalizing these equations to hydrodynamics.

The first derivations of the Navier-Stokes equation appeared in two memoirs by Navier as a result of this work, Sur les lois des mouvements des fluides, en ayant égard à l'adhésion des molecules in 1822, and Sur Les Lois du Mouvement des Fluides in 1823. Previous to these publications, most equations of fluid flow had been formulated in terms of perfect, frictionless fluids. However, in his memoir, Navier introduced friction into the equations of motion of fluids. As a result, Navier is credited with developing the equation of motion for viscous flows.

Navier's original proof was not widely influential, and was re-derived again by Augustin-Louis Cauchy in 1823, by Siméon Denis Poisson in 1829, by Adhémar Barré de Saint-Venant in 1837, and by George Stokes in 1845, with methodological differences, such as which molecular assumptions to use.

Stokes' 1845 proof, published after Navier's death, was particularly influential because he extended Navier's equations to address different behaviors of fluids under boundary conditions. He explicitly addressed the behavior of incompressible fluids, which are fluids that do not change volume under pressure. He also addressed creeping flow (also called 'Stokes flow'), where very slow velocities allow for the equations to simplify and result in analytical solutions. These simplified equations are now called the Stokes equations. Stokes also rederived the Hagen–Poiseuille equation, that gives the pressure drop in an incompressible and Newtonian fluid in laminar flow flowing through a long cylindrical pipe, discovered previously by Jean Léonard Marie Poiseuille and independently by Gotthilf Hagen in 1838.

The final result of these physicists' work was the Navier–Stokes equations, a set of partial differential equations that describe how the velocity, pressure, temperature, and density of a moving fluid are related.

In honor of Stokes' many contributions to fluid mechanics, the unit for kinematic viscosity is called a stoke in his honor.

=== Solitons ===
In 1834, engineer John Scott Russell discovered a type of non-dissipative wave travelling along a canal, which he called solitary waves. These waves could not be explained with the usual theories of the time. It was first studied theoretically by Joseph Valentin Boussinesq in 1871, by Lord Kelvin in 1876, and by Barré de Saint-Venant in 1885. These solitons were finally described by Korteweg–De Vries equation in 1895, in the work of Diderik Korteweg and Gustav de Vries.

=== Reynolds number and turbulence ===
The concept of a number to quantify turbulence was introduced by Stokes in 1851, and its use was popularized by Osborne Reynolds in 1883. Arnold Sommerfeld later christened this number the Reynolds number.

=== Vortex dynamics ===
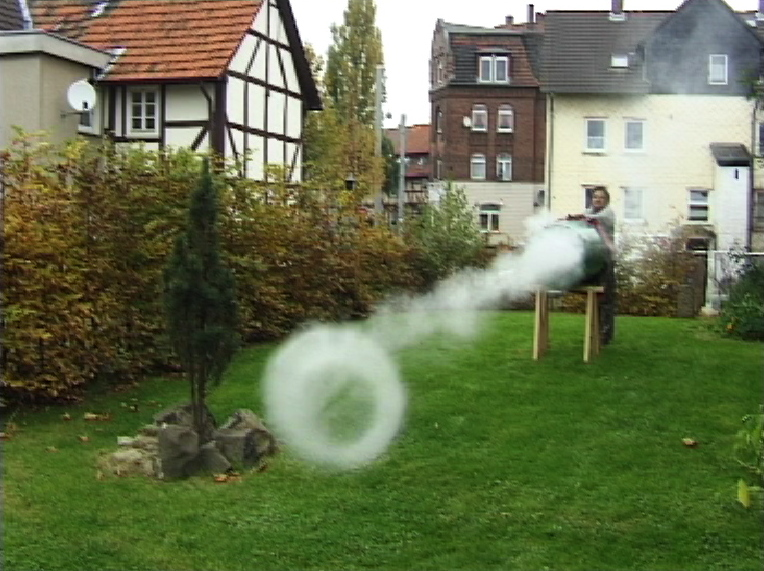
Smoke ring demonstration: a vortex ring of smoke is created using a drum. First described by Hermann von Helmholtz.

In 1858 Hermann von Helmholtz published his seminal paper "Über Integrale der hydrodynamischen Gleichungen, welche den Wirbelbewegungen entsprechen," in Journal für die reine und angewandte Mathematik, vol. 55, pp. 25–55. So important was the paper that a few years later P. G. Tait published an English translation, "On integrals of the hydrodynamical equations which express vortex motion", in Philosophical Magazine, vol. 33, pp. 485–512 (1867). In his paper Helmholtz established his three "laws of vortex motion" in much the same way one finds them in any advanced textbook of fluid mechanics today. This work established the significance of vorticity to fluid mechanics and science in general.

For the next century or so vortex dynamics matured as a subfield of fluid mechanics, always commanding at least a major chapter in treatises on the subject. Thus, Horace Lamb's well known Hydrodynamics (6th ed., 1932) devotes a full chapter to vorticity and vortex dynamics as does G. K. Batchelor's Introduction to Fluid Dynamics (1967). In due course entire treatises were devoted to vortex motion. Henri Poincaré's Théorie des Tourbillons (1893), Henri Villat's Leçons sur la Théorie des Tourbillons (1930), Clifford Truesdell's The Kinematics of Vorticity (1954), and Philip Saffman's Vortex Dynamics (1992) may be mentioned. Early on individual sessions at scientific conferences were devoted to vortices, vortex motion, vortex dynamics and vortex flows. Later, entire meetings were devoted to the subject.

=== 19th century hydraulics ===
The theory of running water was greatly advanced by the researches of Gaspard Riche de Prony (1755–1839). From a collection of the best experiments by previous workers he selected eighty-two (fifty-one on the velocity of water in conduit pipes, and thirty-one on its velocity in open canals); and, discussing these on physical and mechanical principles, he succeeded in drawing up general formulae, which afforded a simple expression for the velocity of running water.

J. A. Eytelwein of Berlin, who published in 1801 a valuable compendium of hydraulics entitled Handbuch der Mechanik und der Hydraulik, investigated the subject of the discharge of water by compound pipes, the motions of jets and their impulses against plane and oblique surfaces; and he showed theoretically that a water-wheel will have its maximum effect when its circumference moves with half the velocity of the stream.

Jean Nicolas Pierre Hachette in 1816–1817 published memoirs containing the results of experiments on the spouting of fluids and the discharge of vessels. His object was to measure the contracted part of a fluid vein, to examine the phenomena attendant on additional tubes, and to investigate the form of the fluid vein and the results obtained when different forms of orifices are employed. Extensive experiments on the discharge of water from orifices (Expériences hydrauliques, Paris, 1832) were conducted under the direction of the French government by J. V. Poncelet (1788–1867) and J. A. Lesbros (1790–1860).

Pierre Prosper Boileau (1811–1891) discussed their results and added experiments of his own (Traité de la mesure des eaux courantes, Paris, 1854). K. R. Bornemann re-examined all these results with great care, and gave formulae expressing the variation of the coefficients of discharge in different conditions (Civil Ingénieur, 1880). Julius Weisbach (1806–1871) also made many experimental investigations on the discharge of fluids.

The experiments of J. B. Francis (Lowell Hydraulic Experiments, Boston, Mass., 1855) led him to propose variations in the accepted formulae for the discharge over weirs, and a generation later a very complete investigation of this subject was carried out by Henri-Émile Bazin. An elaborate inquiry on the flow of water in pipes and channels was conducted by Henry G. P. Darcy (1803–1858) and continued by Bazin, at the expense of the French government (Recherches hydrauliques, Paris, 1866).

German engineers have also devoted special attention to the measurement of the flow in rivers; the Beiträge zur Hydrographie des Königreiches Böhmen (Prague, 1872–1875) of Andreas Rudolf Harlacher contained valuable measurements of this kind, together with a comparison of the experimental results with the formulae of flow that had been proposed up to the date of its publication, and important data were yielded by the gaugings of the Mississippi made for the United States government by Andrew Atkinson Humphreys and Henry Larcom Abbot, by Robert Gordon's gaugings of the Irrawaddy River, and by Allen J. C. Cunningham's experiments on the Ganges canal. The friction of water, investigated for slow speeds by Charles-Augustin de Coulomb, was measured for higher speeds by William Froude (1810–1879), whose work is of great value in the theory of ship resistance (Brit. Assoc. Report., 1869), and stream line motion was studied by Reynolds and by Henry Selby Hele-Shaw.

== Twentieth century ==
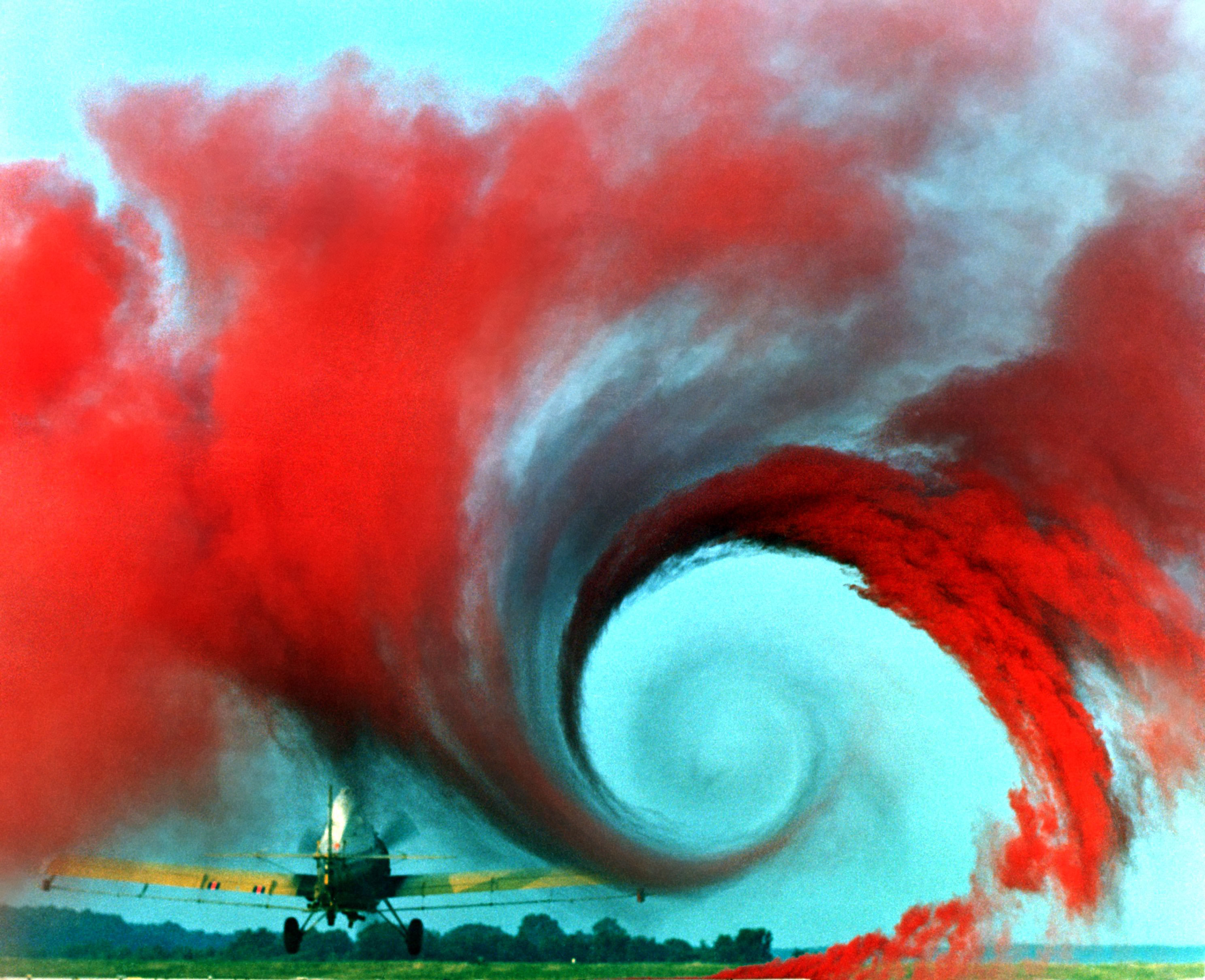
Turbulent air flow from the wing of this agricultural plane is made visible by a technique that uses colored smoke rising from the ground. conditions at airports. The 20th century was characterized by the developments in the theory of aerodynamics and turbulent flow.

=== Boundary layer ===
In 1904, German scientist Ludwig Prandtl pioneered boundary layer theory. He pointed out that fluids with small viscosity can be divided into a thin viscous layer, known as the boundary layer, near solid surfaces and interfaces, and an outer layer where Bernoulli's principle and Euler equations apply.

=== Relativistic ideal fluids ===
During the second half of the 19th century, it was found that ideal fluid equations related to the balance of energy must at all times be kept for compressible flows, and the adiabatic condition is a consequence of the fundamental laws in the case of smooth solutions. With the discovery of Albert Einstein' theory of relativity, the concepts of energy density, momentum density, and stress were unified into the concept of the stress–energy tensor, and energy and momentum were likewise unified into a single concept, the energy–momentum vector.

The first study of a relativistic perfect fluid to study star collapse was done by Richard C. Tolman, and independently by J. Robert Oppenheimer and George Volkoff in 1939. Tolman–Oppenheimer–Volkoff equation describes the hydrostatic equilibrium in a static spherically symmetric spacetime supported by an isotropic perfect fluid.

=== Developments in vorticity and turbulence ===
From 1894-1910, vortex dynamics achieved more attention and development as a result of the concurrently developing field of aerodynamics. The Kutta–Joucowski theorem, for example, developed from 1902-1906, is a fundamental result in aerodynamics that was proved by considering the fluid flow in the presence of the airfoil as the superposition of a translational flow and a rotating flow. The rotating flow is solved using vortex dynamics by considering it as being induced by a line vortex. Much of the wing-flow problem in aerodynamics was solved in a similar fashion, by taking advantage of vortex dynamics.

As high-speed flight necessitated further developments, the problem of turbulence began to gain increasing relevance in the mid-twentieth century. A detailed theory of turbulence was published in 1941 by Andrey Kolmogorov. Turbulent flow describes unpredictable or chaotic changes in pressure and flow velocity. In turbulent flow, unsteady vortices interact with each other and increase drag and friction as a result.

Vorticity and vortex lines have been used to understand how turbulent fluids behave. In the twentieth century, the discovery of turbulent coherent structures allowed for the development of theories of vortex dynamics in turbulence. These turbulent coherent structures are regions of concentrated vorticity that are organized and persist for a long time. In modern fluid mechanics the role of vortex dynamics in explaining flow phenomena is firmly established. Well known vortices have acquired names and are regularly depicted in the popular media: hurricanes, tornadoes, waterspouts, aircraft trailing vortices (e.g., wingtip vortices), drainhole vortices (including the bathtub vortex), smoke rings, underwater bubble air rings, cavitation vortices behind ship propellers, and so on. In the technical literature a number of vortices that arise under special conditions also have names: the Kármán vortex street wake behind a bluff body, Taylor vortices between rotating cylinders, Görtler vortices in flow along a curved wall, etc.

The behavior of turbulent flow remains an unsolved problem in fluid mechanics. Methods to address turbulence include direct numerical simulation and large eddy simulation.

=== Superfluidity ===
Heike Kamerlingh Onnes working on cryogenics, first liquefied helium-4 (^{4}He)in 1908, reaching temperatures below 2.2 K. Onnes noticed that its properties were unusual and by 1924 he noticed that the density of ^{4}He reached a peak at 2.2 K. Willem Hendrik Keesom and Mieczysław Wolfke postulated that a phase transition occurred at that temperature and called it the lambda point due to the shape of the experimental curve of the specific heat capacity as a function of temperature.

In 1937 Pyotr Kapitsa in the Soviet Union, and independently, John F. Allen and Donald Misener in the United States, discovered that below the lambda point, the liquid helium going through a narrow passage had no measurable viscosity. Kapitsa coined the term superfluid to describe the phenomenon.

Atoms of ^{4}He are bosons (integer spin) and can aggregate to the same state at low temperature, thus superfluid helium-4 is partially described as a Bose–Einstein condensate. In helium-3 (^{3}He), the atoms are fermions (half-integer spin) so a condensate is not possible unless two atoms aggregate to form a boson, as in Cooper pairing in superconductivity. Two theoretical models were proposed, one by Philip W. Anderson and Pierre Morel, and another by Roger Balian and N. Richard Werthamer (and independently by Yuri Vdovin). In 1950, Isaak Pomeranchuk proposed a model when compressing the liquid into a solid, below 0.3 K, would cool it further, this method became known as Pomeranchuk cells. The superfluid phase of ^{3}He was finally discovered in 1972 by Douglas Osheroff, Robert Coleman Richardson, and David Lee. These three scientists would earn the Nobel Prize in Physics in 1993.

=== Microfluidics ===
Beginning in the 1950s, advances in semiconductor device fabrication enabled the creation of engraving micro-patterns, sparking interest in miniaturizing sensors, and integrating them with microcomputers to develop portable platforms for scientific research. Stephen C. Terry from Standford University miniaturized gas chromatograph on a silicon wafer in the 1979, considered one of the first lab-on-a-chip. Building on this, Swiss chemist Andreas Manz introduced in 1990 the concept of the miniaturized total analysis system (μTAS), capable of performing complete analyses on a microfluidic chip. The 1990s saw rapid progress through soft lithography techniques pioneered by George M. Whitesides, which enabled inexpensive devices fabricated in polymers such as polydimethylsiloxane (PDMS). By the end of the decade, microfluidics was firmly established with applications in capillary electrophoresis, genetic testing, droplet-based microfluidics, polymerase chain reaction (PCR) tests and other technologies of the 21st century.

== Twenty-first century ==
=== Millennium Prize Problem ===
In 2000, the Clay Mathematics Institute put forth the Millennium Prize Problems, which are seven unsolved mathematical problems which are deemed to be the most difficult and illusive. One of which is the fluid mechanics problem of Navier–Stokes existence and smoothness, which deals with the mathematical properties of the Navier-Stokes equations. The statement of the problem, as proposed by Charles Fefferman, goes as follows:

Prove or give a counter-example of the following statement: In three space dimensions and time, given an initial velocity field, there exists a vector velocity and a scalar pressure field, which are both smooth and globally defined, that solve the Navier–Stokes equations.

The prize sparked interest in the problem. In 2016, mathematician Terence Tao published "Finite time blowup for an averaged three-dimensional Navier–Stokes equation", where he invents an "averaged" version of the equations and shows that it exhibits breakdown. He suggests a program for constructing a blowup solution to the true Navier-Stokes equations. In September 2025, Google DeepMind announced it had used machine learning techniques to uncover "the first systematic discovery of new families of unstable singularities" in the equations of fluid flow.

== See also ==
- Timeline of fluid and continuum mechanics
