= Oseen =

Oseen may refer to:

- Basset–Boussinesq–Oseen equation, Equation describing particle motion in unsteady, low-Reynolds fluid flow
- Carl Wilhelm Oseen (1879–1944), Swedish theoretical physicist
- Ewald–Oseen extinction theorem, Theorem in optics that explains light propagation in a medium
- Lamb–Oseen vortex, Line vortex
- Oseen equations, Formulae for viscous and incompressible fluid flow at small Reynolds numbers
