= Stokes' paradox =

Fluid dynamics phenomenon

In the science of fluid flow, Stokes' paradox is the phenomenon that there can be no creeping flow of a fluid around a disk in two dimensions; or, equivalently, the fact there is no non-trivial steady-state solution for the Stokes equations around an infinitely long cylinder. This is opposed to the 3-dimensional case, where Stokes' method provides a solution to the problem of flow around a sphere.

Stokes' paradox was resolved by Carl Wilhelm Oseen in 1910, by introducing the Oseen equations which improve upon the Stokes equations – by adding convective acceleration.

== Derivation ==
The velocity vector $\mathbf{u}$ of the fluid may be written in terms of the stream function $\psi$ as

$$\mathbf{u} = \left(\frac{\partial \psi}{\partial y}, - \frac{\partial \psi}{\partial x}\right).$$

The stream function in a Stokes flow problem, $\psi$ satisfies the biharmonic equation. By regarding the $(x,y)$-plane as the complex plane, the problem may be dealt with using methods of complex analysis. In this approach, $\psi$ is either the real or imaginary part of

$\bar{z} f(z) + g(z)$.

Here $z = x + iy$, where $i$ is the imaginary unit, $\bar{z} = x - iy$, and $f(z), g(z)$ are holomorphic functions outside of the disk. We will take the real part without loss of generality. Now the function $u$, defined by $u = u_x + iu_y$ is introduced. $u$ can be written as $u = -2i \frac{\partial \psi}{\partial \bar{z}}$, or $\frac{1}{2} iu = \frac{\partial \psi}{\partial \bar{z}}$ (using the Wirtinger derivatives). This is calculated to be equal to

$$\frac{1}{2} iu = f(z) + z \bar{f \prime}(z) + \bar{g \prime}(z).$$

Without loss of generality, the disk may be assumed to be the unit disk, consisting of all complex numbers z of absolute value smaller or equal to 1.

The boundary conditions are:

$$\lim_{z \to \infty} u = 1,$$
$$u = 0,$$

whenever $|z| = 1$, and by representing the functions $f, g$ as Laurent series:

$$f(z) = \sum_{n = -\infty}^\infty f_n z^n, \quad g(z) = \sum_{n = -\infty}^\infty g_n z^n,$$

the first condition implies $f_n = 0, g_n = 0$ for all $n \geq 2$.

Using the polar form of $z$ results in $z^n = r^n e^{in\theta}, \bar{z}^n = r^n e^{-in \theta}$. After deriving the series form of u, substituting this into it along with $r = 1$, and changing some indices, the second boundary condition translates to

$$\sum_{n = -\infty}^\infty e^{in \theta} \left( f_n + (2 - n) \bar{f}_{2-n} + (1 - n) \bar{g}_{1-n} \right) = 0.$$

Since the complex trigonometric functions $e^{in \theta}$ compose a linearly independent set, it follows that all coefficients in the series are zero. Examining these conditions for every $n$ after taking into account the condition at infinity shows that $f$ and $g$ are necessarily of the form

$$f(z) = az + b, \quad g(z) = -bz + c,$$

where $a$ is an imaginary number (opposite to its own complex conjugate), and $b$ and $c$ are complex numbers. Substituting this into $u$ gives the result that $u = 0$ globally, compelling both $u_x$ and $u_y$ to be zero. Therefore, there can be no motion – the only solution is that the cylinder is at rest relative to all points of the fluid.

== Resolution ==
The paradox is caused by the limited validity of Stokes' approximation, as explained in Oseen's criticism: the validity of Stokes' equations relies on Reynolds number being small, and this condition cannot hold for arbitrarily large distances $r$.

A correct solution for a cylinder was derived using Oseen's equations, and the same equations lead to an improved approximation of the drag force on a sphere.

== Unsteady-state flow around a circular cylinder ==
On the contrary to Stokes' paradox, there exists the unsteady-state solution of the same problem which models a fluid flow moving around a circular cylinder with Reynolds number being small. This solution can be given by explicit formula in terms of vorticity of the flow's vector field.

=== Formula of the Stokes Flow around a circular cylinder ===
The vorticity of Stokes' flow is given by the following relation:
$$w_k(t,r) = W^{-1}_{|k|,|k|-1} \left [ e^{-\lambda^2 t} W_{|k|,|k|-1} [w_k(0,\cdot)](\lambda) \right ](t,r).$$

Here $w_k(t,r)$ - are the Fourier coefficients of the vorticity's expansion by polar angle which are defined on $(r_0,\infty)$, $r_0$ - radius of the cylinder, $W_{|k|,|k|-1}$, $W^{-1}_{|k|,|k|-1}$ are the direct and inverse special Weber's transforms, and initial function for vorticity $w_k(0,r)$ satisfies no-slip boundary condition.

Special Weber's transform has a non-trivial kernel, but from the no-slip condition follows orthogonality of the vorticity flow to the kernel.

=== Derivation ===
==== Special Weber's transform ====
Special Weber's transform is an important tool in solving problems of the hydrodynamics. It is defined for $k\in \mathbb{R}$ as
$$W_{k,k- 1}[f](\lambda) = \int_{r_0}^\infty \frac{J_{k}(\lambda s)Y_{k- 1}(\lambda r_0) - Y_{k}(\lambda s)J_{k- 1}(\lambda r_0)}
{\sqrt{J_{k- 1}^2(\lambda r_0) + Y_{k- 1}^2(\lambda r_0)}}   f(s) s ds,$$
where $J_k$, $Y_k$ are the Bessel functions of the first and second kind respectively. For $k>1$ it has a non-trivial kernel which consists of the functions $C/r^k \in \ker(W_{k,k-1})$.

The inverse transform is given by the formula
$$W^{-1}_{k,k- 1}[\hat f](r) = \int_{0}^\infty \frac  {J_{k}(\lambda r)Y_{k- 1}(\lambda r_0) - Y_{k}(\lambda s)J_{k- 1}(\lambda r_0)}{\sqrt{J_{k- 1}^2(\lambda r_0) + Y_{k- 1}^2(\lambda r_0)}} \hat f (\lambda) \lambda d\lambda.$$

Due to non-triviality of the kernel, the inversion identity
$$f(r) = W^{-1}_{k,k-1}\left [W_{k,k-1} [f] \right ](r)$$
is valid if $k\leq 1$. Also it is valid in the case of $k> 1$ but only for functions, which are orthogonal to the kernel of $W_{k,k-1}$ in $L_2(r_0,\infty)$ with infinitesimal element $rdr$:
$$\int_{r_0}^\infty \frac 1{r^k} f(r) r dr = 0,~k>1.$$

==== No-slip condition and Biot–Savart law ====
In exterior of the disc of radius $r_0$ $B_{r_0}=\{\mathbf{x} \in \mathbb{R}^2,~\vert \mathbf{x} \vert > r_0 \}$ the Biot-Savart law
$$\mathbf{v}(\mathbf{x}) =\frac 1{2\pi} \int_{B_{r_0}} \frac{(\mathbf{x}-\mathbf{y})^\perp}{\vert\mathbf{x}-\mathbf{y}\vert^2} w(\mathbf{y}) \operatorname{d\mathbf{y}} + \mathbf{v}_\infty,$$
restores the velocity field $\mathbf{v}(\mathbf{x})$ which is induced by the vorticity $w(\mathbf{x})$ with zero-circularity and given constant velocity $\mathbf{v}_\infty$ at infinity.

No-slip condition for $\mathbf{x}\in S_{r_0}=\{\mathbf{x} \in \mathbb{R}^2,~\vert \mathbf{x} \vert = r_0 \}$
$$\frac 1{2\pi} \int_{B_{r_0}} \frac{(\mathbf{x}-\mathbf{y})^\perp}{\vert\mathbf{x}-\mathbf{y}\vert^2} w(\mathbf{y}) \operatorname{d\mathbf{y}} + \mathbf{v}_\infty =0$$
leads to the relations for $k\in \mathbf{Z}$:
$$\int_{r_0}^\infty r^{-\vert k \vert+1}w_k(r)dr = d_k,$$
where $d_k=\delta_{\vert k \vert,1} (v_{\infty,y} + i k v_{\infty,x}),$ $\delta_{\vert k \vert,1}$ is the Kronecker delta, $v_{\infty,x}$, $v_{\infty,y}$ are the cartesian coordinates of $\mathbf{v}_\infty$.

In particular, from the no-slip condition follows orthogonality the vorticity to the kernel of the Weber's transform $W_{k,k- 1}$:
$$\int_{r_0}^\infty r^{-\vert k \vert+1}w_k(r)dr = 0 ~for~ |k|>1.$$

==== Vorticity flow and its boundary condition ====
Vorticity $w(t,\mathbf{x})$ for Stokes flow satisfies to the vorticity equation
$$\frac{\partial w(t,\mathbf{x})}{\partial t}	 - \Delta w = 0,$$
or in terms of the Fourier coefficients in the expansion by polar angle
$$\frac{\partial w_k(t,r)}{\partial t}	 - \Delta w_k = 0,$$
where
$$\Delta_k w_k(t,r) = \frac 1r \frac {\partial}{\partial r}\left(r \frac {\partial}{\partial r}w_k(t,r)\right) - \frac{k^2}{r^2} w_k(t,r).$$

From no-slip condition follows
$$\frac d{dt} \int_{r_0}^\infty r^{-\vert k \vert+1}w_k(t,r)dr = 0.$$

Finally, integrating by parts, we obtain the Robin boundary condition for the vorticity:
$$\int_{r_0}^\infty s^{-|k|+1} \Delta_k w_k(t,r)dr
= - r_0^{-|k|}\left(r_0 \frac{\partial w_k(t,r)}{\partial r}\Big|_{r=r_0} + |k| w_k(t,r_0) \right ) = 0.$$
Then the solution of the boundary-value problem can be expressed via Weber's integral above.

=== Remark ===
Formula for vorticity can give another explanation of the Stokes' Paradox. The functions $\frac C{r^k} \in ker(\Delta_k),~k>1$ belong to the kernel of $\Delta_k$ and generate the stationary solutions of the vorticity equation with Robin-type boundary condition. From the arguments above any Stokes' vorticity flow with no-slip boundary condition must be orthogonal to the obtained stationary solutions. That is only possible for $w\equiv 0$.

== See also ==
- Oseen's approximation
- Stokes' law
