= Torricelli's law =

Theorem in fluid mechanics

Torricelli's law describes the parting speed of a jet of water, based on the distance below the surface at which the jet starts, assuming no air resistance, viscosity, or other hindrance to the fluid flow. This diagram shows several such jets, vertically aligned, leaving the reservoir horizontally. In this case, the jets have an envelope (a concept also due to Torricelli) which is a line descending at 45° from the water's surface over the jets. Each jet reaches farther than any other jet at the point where it touches the envelope, which is at twice the depth of the jet's source. The depth at which two jets cross is the sum of their source depths. Every jet (even if not leaving horizontally) takes a parabolic path whose directrix is the surface of the water.

Torricelli's law, also known as Torricelli's theorem, is a theorem in fluid dynamics relating the speed of fluid flowing from a hole to the height of fluid above the hole. The law states that the speed $v$ of efflux of a fluid through a sharp-edged hole in the wall of the tank filled to a height $h$ above the hole is the same as the speed that a body would acquire in falling freely from a height $h$,

$v = \sqrt{2gh}$

where $g$ is the acceleration due to gravity. This expression comes from equating the kinetic energy gained, $\tfrac{1}{2} mv^2$, with the potential energy lost, $mgh$, and solving for $v.$ The law was discovered (though not in this form) by the Italian scientist Evangelista Torricelli, in 1643. It was later shown to be a particular case of Bernoulli's principle.

== Derivation ==
Under the assumption of an incompressible fluid with negligible viscosity, Bernoulli's principle states that the energy of the fluid is conserved:

$$\frac{p_1}{\rho_1} + \frac{{v_1}^2}{2} + g y_1 = \frac{p_2}{\rho_2} + \frac{{v_2}^2}{2} + g y_2 = \text{constant}$$

throughout a column of liquid. Here $v$ is the fluid's speed, $g$ is the acceleration due to gravity, $y$ is the height above some reference point, $p$ is the pressure, and $\rho$ is the density.

In order to derive Torricelli's formula we take the first point to be at the liquid's surface, and the second just outside the opening. Since the liquid is assumed to be incompressible, $\rho_1 = \rho_2 = \rho$. The pressures $p_1$ and $p_2$ are typically both atmospheric pressure, so $p_1 = p_2 = p_\text{atm}$. Furthermore $y_1 - y_2$ is equal to the height $h$ of the liquid's surface over the opening. With these identifications, Bernoulli's law simplifies to:

$$\frac{{v_1}^2}{2} + g h = \frac{{v_2}^2}{2}$$

The velocity of the surface $v_1$ can by related to the outflow velocity $v_2$ by the continuity equation $v_1 A = v_2 A_A$, where $A_A$ is the orifice's cross section and $A$ is the (cylindrical) vessel's cross section. Renaming $v_2$ to $v_A$ (A like Aperture) gives:

$$\frac{{v_A}^2}{2} \frac{A_A^2}{A^2}  + g h = \frac{{v_A}^2}{2}$$
$$\Rightarrow  g h = \frac{{v_A}^2}{2}\left( 1 - \frac{A_A^2}{A^2} \right) .$$

$$\Rightarrow {v_A} = \sqrt{ \frac{ 2 g  h  }{1 - \frac{A_A^2}{A^2} } } .$$

Torricelli's law is obtained as a special case when the opening $A_A$ is very small relative to the horizontal cross-section of the container $A$:

$v_A = \sqrt{2gh}.$

Torricelli's law can only be applied when viscous effects can be neglected which is the case for water flowing out through orifices in vessels.

=== Experimental verification: Spouting can experiment ===
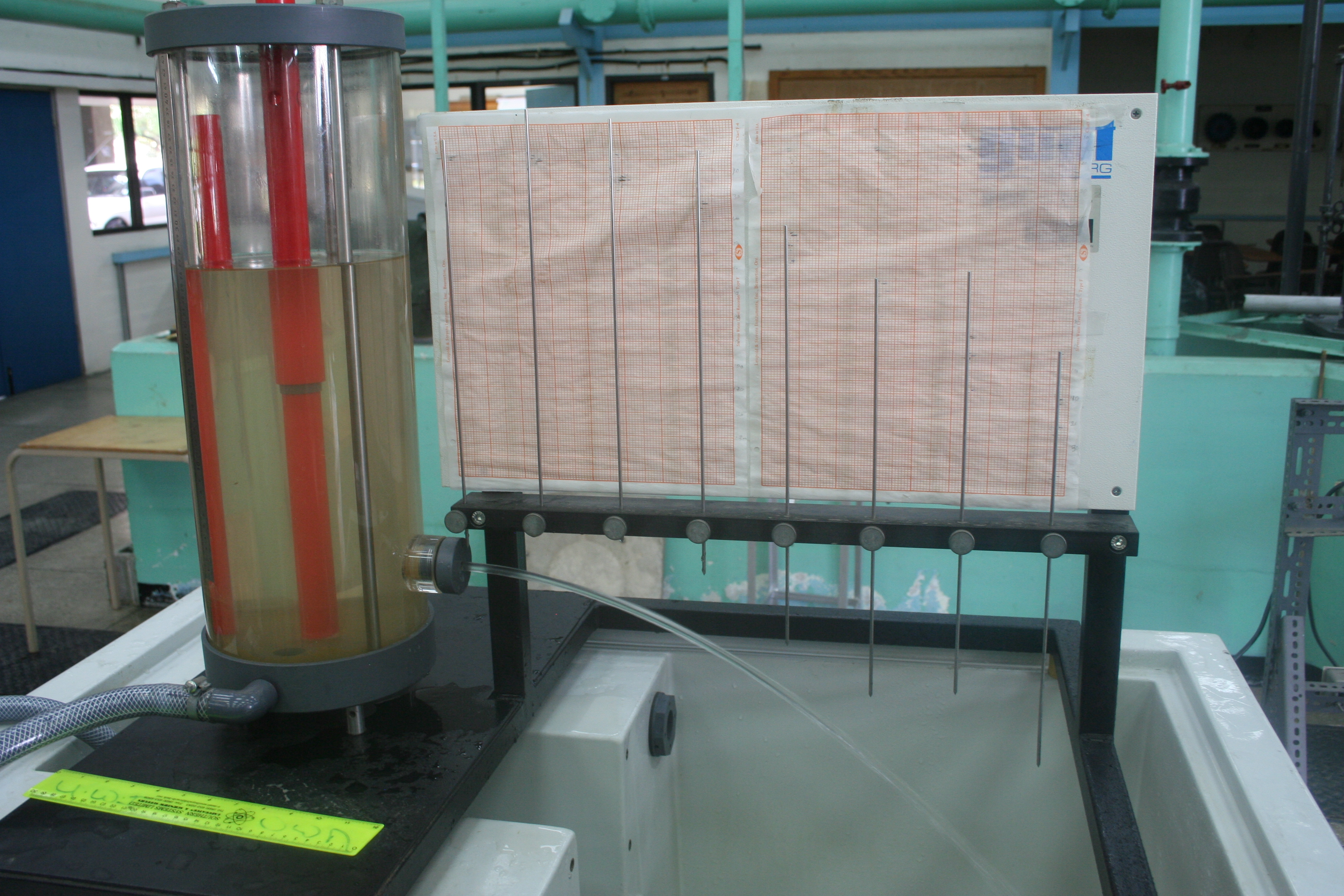
Experiment to determine the trajectory of an outflowing jet: Vertical rods are adjusted so they are nearly touching the jet. After the experiment the distance between a horizontal line and the location of the jet can be measured by the length adjustments of the rods.

Every physical law must be verified by experiments. The spouting can experiment consists of a cylindrical vessel filled up with water and with several holes in different heights. It is designed to show that in a liquid with an open surface, pressure increases with depth. The fluid exit velocity is greater further down the vessel.

The outflowing jet forms a downward parabola where every parabola reaches farther out the larger the distance between the orifice and the surface is. The shape of the parabola $y(x)$ is only dependent on the outflow velocity and can be determined from the fact that every molecule of the liquid forms a ballistic trajectory (see projectile motion) where the initial velocity is the outflow velocity $v_A$:

$$y(x)=-\frac{1}{2} \frac{g}{v_A^2} x^2.$$

The results confirm the correctness of Torricelli's law very well.

== Discharge and time to empty a cylindrical vessel ==
Assuming that a vessel is cylindrical with fixed cross-sectional area $A$, with orifice of area $A_A$ at the bottom, then the rate of change of water level height $dh/dt$ is not constant. The velocity of the water leaving the orifice is directly proportional to the height of the water surface above the level of the orifice - as the height of the water reduces, the pressure at the level of the orifice also reduces, causing the water to exit from the orifice at a progressively slower speed:

$$\dot{V} = \frac{dV}{dt} = A \frac{dh}{dt} = - A_A v_A = - A_A \sqrt{2gh} \quad \Rightarrow \quad \frac{dh}{\sqrt{h}} = - \frac{A_A}{A} \sqrt{2g} \; dt$$

We integrate both sides and re-arrange the result to determine the height of the water level $h(t)$ as a function of time $t$:

$$h(t) = H \left(1 - \frac{A_A}{A} \sqrt{\frac{g}{2H}}t \right)^2,$$

where $H$ is the initial height of the water level. The total time $T$ taken to drain all the water and hence empty the vessel is found by setting $h(T)=0$ and re-arranging:

$$T = \frac{A}{A_A} \sqrt{\frac{2H}{g}}.$$

This formula has several implications. If a tank with volume $V$ with cross section $A$ and height $H$, so that $V = AH$, is fully filled, then the time to drain all the water is

$$T = \frac{V}{A_A} \sqrt{\frac{2}{gH}}.$$

This implies that high tanks with same filling volume drain faster than wider ones. Lastly, we can rewrite the function $h(t)$ as

$$h(t) = H \left(1 - \frac{t}{T} \right)^2,$$

where $H$ is the height of the container while $T$ is the discharge time as given above.

=== Discharge experiment, coefficient of discharge ===
The discharge theory can be tested by measuring the emptying time $T$ or time series of the water level $h(t)$ within the cylindrical vessel. In many cases, such experiments do not confirm the presented discharge theory: when comparing the theoretical predictions of the discharge process with measurements, very large differences can be found in such cases. In reality, the tank usually drains much more slowly. Looking at the discharge formula

$$\dot{V} = A_A v_A = A_A \sqrt{2gh}$$

two quantities could be responsible for this discrepancy: the outflow velocity or the effective outflow cross section.

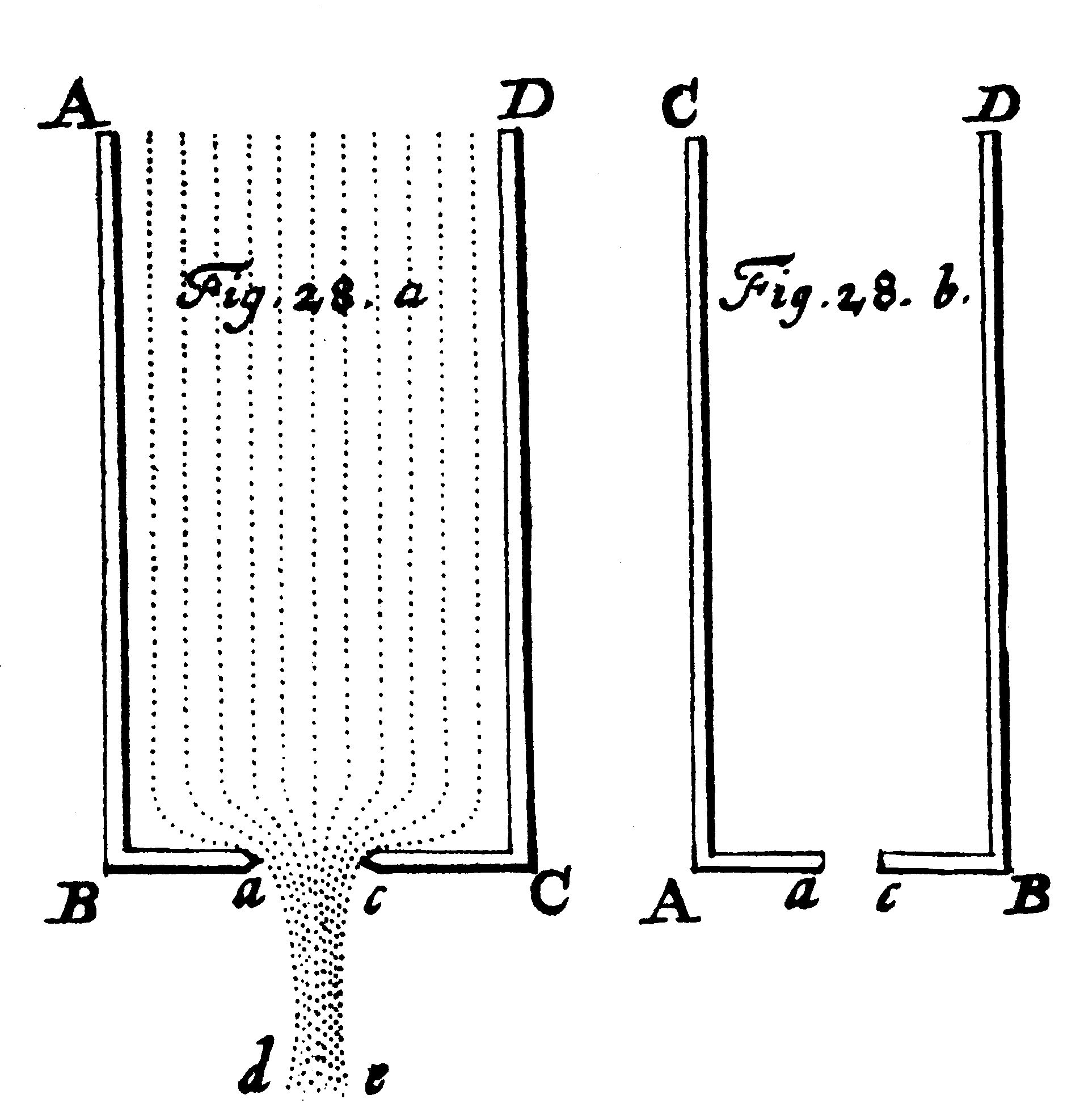
Figure 28 of Daniel Bernoulli's Hydrodynamica (1738) showing the generation of a vena contracta with streamlines.

In 1738 Daniel Bernoulli attributed the discrepancy between the theoretical and the observed outflow behavior to the formation of a vena contracta which reduces the outflow cross-section from the orifice's cross-section $A_A$ to the contracted cross-section $A_C$ and stated that the discharge is:

$$\dot{V} = A_C v_A = A_C \sqrt{2gh}$$

Actually this is confirmed by state-of-the-art experiments (see) in which the discharge, the outflow velocity and the cross-section of the vena contracta were measured. Here it was also shown that the outflow velocity is predicted extremely well by Torricelli's law and that no velocity correction (like a "coefficient of velocity") is needed.

The problem remains how to determine the cross-section of the vena contracta. This is normally done by introducing a discharge coefficient which relates the discharge to the orifice's cross-section and Torricelli's law:

$${\dot {V}}_{\text{real}}=\mu A_A v_A \quad \text{with} \quad \mu = \frac{A_C}{A_A}$$

For low viscosity liquids (such as water) flowing out of a round hole in a tank, the discharge coefficient is in the order of 0.65. By discharging through a round tube or hose, the coefficient of discharge can be increased to over 0.9. For rectangular openings, the discharge coefficient can be up to 0.67, depending on the height-width ratio.

== Applications ==
=== Horizontal distance covered by the jet of liquid ===
If $h$ is height of the orifice above the ground and $H$ is height of the liquid column from the ground (height of liquid's surface), then the horizontal distance covered by the jet of liquid to reach the same level as the base of the liquid column can be easily derived. Since $h$ be the vertical height traveled by a particle of jet stream, we have from the laws of falling bodies

$$h = \frac{1}{2} gt^2 \quad \Rightarrow \quad t = \sqrt{\frac{2h}{g}},$$

where $t$ is the time taken by the jet particle to fall from the orifice to the ground. If the horizontal efflux velocity is $v$, then the horizontal distance traveled by the jet particle during the time duration $t$ is

$$D = vt = v \sqrt{\frac{2h}{g}}.$$

Since the water level is $H-h$ above the orifice, the horizontal efflux velocity $v = \sqrt{2g(H-h)},$ as given by Torricelli's law. Thus, we have from the two equations

$$D = 2 \sqrt{h(H-h)}.$$

The location of the orifice that yields the maximum horizontal range is obtained by differentiating the above equation for $D$ with respect to $h$, and solving $dD/dh = 0$. Here we have

$$\frac{dD}{dh} = \frac{H - 2h}{\sqrt{h(H-h)}}.$$

Solving $dD/dh = 0,$ we obtain

$$h^* = \frac{H}{2},$$

and the maximum range

$$D_{\max} = H.$$

=== Clepsydra problem ===
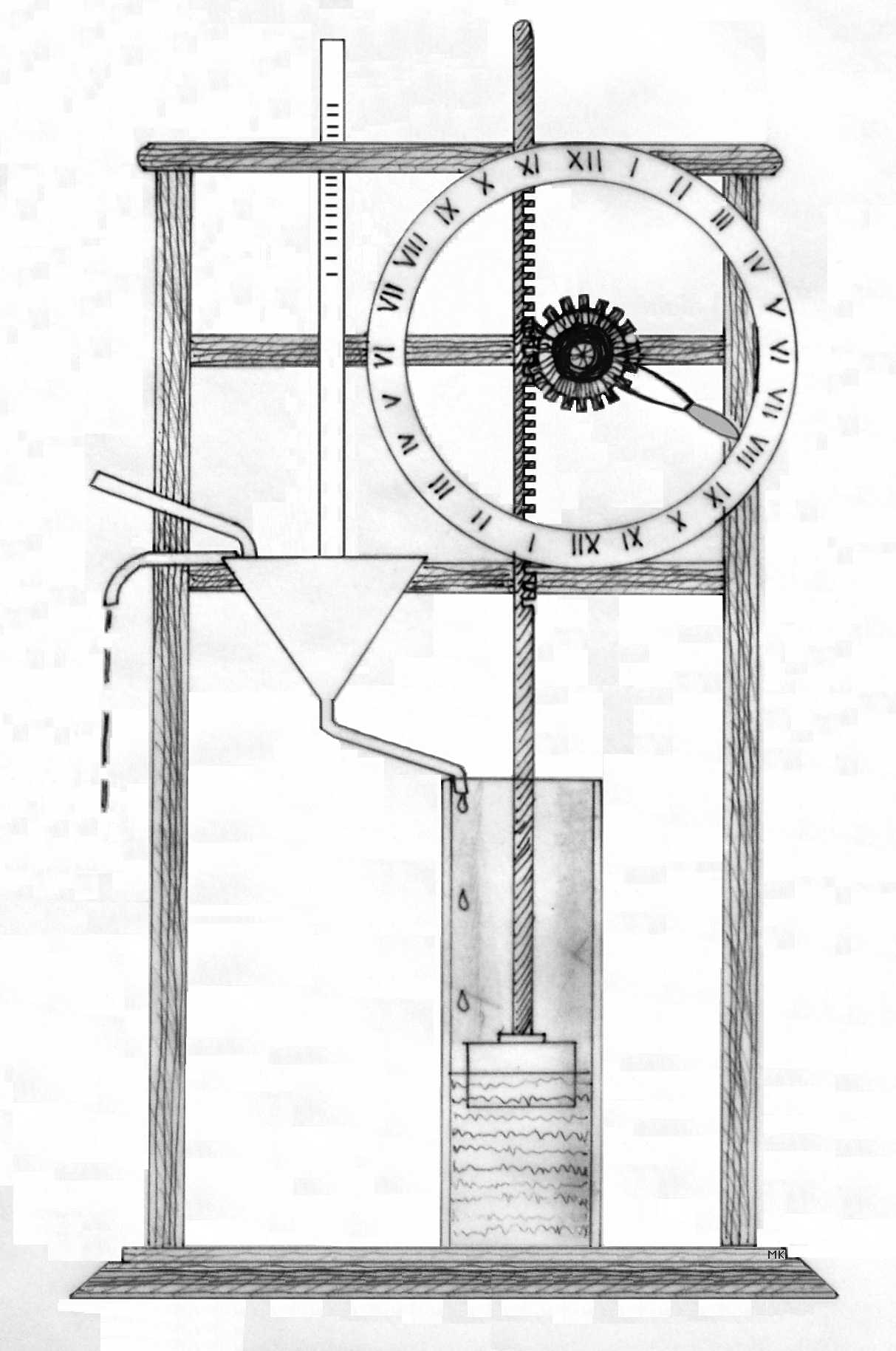
An inflow clepsydra

A clepsydra is a clock that measures time by the flow of water. It consists of a pot with a small hole at the bottom through which the water can escape. The amount of escaping water gives the measure of time. As given by the Torricelli's law, the rate of efflux through the hole depends on the height of the water; and as the water level diminishes, the discharge is not uniform. A simple solution is to keep the height of the water constant. This can be attained by letting a constant stream of water flow into the vessel, the overflow of which is allowed to escape from the top, from another hole. Thus having a constant height, the discharging water from the bottom can be collected in another cylindrical vessel with uniform graduation to measure time. This is an inflow clepsydra.

Alternatively, by carefully selecting the shape of the vessel, the water level in the vessel can be made to decrease at constant rate. By measuring the level of water remaining in the vessel, the time can be measured with uniform graduation. This is an example of outflow clepsydra. Since the water outflow rate is higher when the water level is higher (due to more pressure), the fluid's volume should be more than a simple cylinder when the water level is high. That is, the radius should be larger when the water level is higher. Let the radius $r$ increase with the height of the water level $h$ above the exit hole of area $a.$ That is, $r = f(h)$. We want to find the radius such that the water level has a constant rate of decrease, i.e. $dh/dt = c$.

At a given water level $h$, the water surface area is $A = \pi r^2$. The instantaneous rate of change in water volume is

$$\frac{dV}{dt} = A \frac{dh}{dt} = \pi r^2 c.$$

From Torricelli's law, the rate of outflow is

$$\frac{dV}{dt} = A_A v = A_A \sqrt{2gh},$$

From these two equations,

$$\begin{align}
A_A \sqrt{2gh} &= \pi r^2 c \\
\Rightarrow \quad h &= \frac{\pi^2 c^2}{2g A_A^2} r^4.
\end{align}$$

Thus, the radius of the container should change in proportion to the quartic root of its height, $r \propto \sqrt[4]{h}.$

Likewise, if the shape of the vessel of the outflow clepsydra cannot be modified according to the above specification, then we need to use non-uniform graduation to measure time. The emptying time formula above tells us the time should be calibrated as the square root of the discharged water height, $T \propto \sqrt{h}.$ More precisely,

$$\Delta t = \frac{A}{A_A} \sqrt{\frac{2}{g}} (\sqrt{h_1} - \sqrt{h_2})$$

where $\Delta t$ is the time taken by the water level to fall from the height of $h_1$ to height of $h_2$.

== Torricelli's original derivation ==
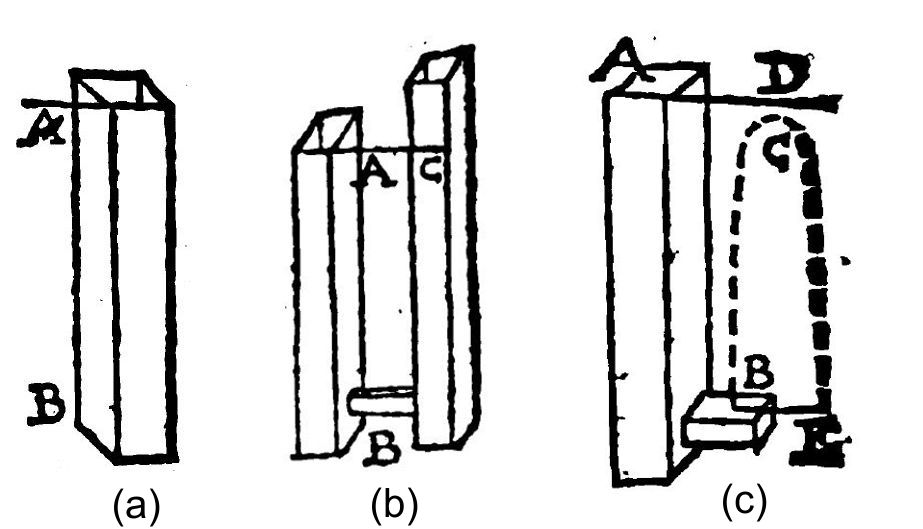
Figures from Evangelista Torricelli's Opera Geometrica (1644) describing the derivation of his famous outflow formula: (a) One tube filled up with water from A to B. (b) In two connected tubes the water lift up to the same height. (c) When the tube C is removed, the water should rise up to the height D. Due to friction effects the water only rises to the point C.

Evangelista Torricelli's original derivation can be found in work "De motu aquarum", which is an appendix to the second of the three main works of his Opera Geometrica, titled "De motu gravium". He assumes the law as a supposition which he tries to prove experimentally, writing: "Let us suppose that the water, which exits violently from an orifice has, in that point the same impetus as a heavy body, or a drop of that water which falls from the liquid's surface until the orifice." He claims that experience confirms this principle, as follows.

He starts a tube AB (Figure (a)) filled up with water to the level A. Then a narrow opening is drilled at the level of B and connected to a second vertical tube BC. Due to the hydrostatic principle of communicating vessels the water lifts up to the same filling level AC in both tubes (Figure (b)). When finally the tube BC is removed (Figure (c)) the water should again lift up to this height, which is named AD in Figure (c). The reason for that behavior is the fact that a droplet's falling velocity from a height A to B is equal to the initial velocity that is needed to lift up a droplet from B to A.

When performing such an experiment only the height C (instead of D in figure (c)) will be reached which contradicts the proposed theory. Torricelli attributes this defect to the air resistance and to the fact that the descending drops collide with ascending drops.

Torricelli's argumentation is, as a matter of fact, wrong because the pressure in free jet is the surrounding atmospheric pressure, while the pressure in a communicating vessel is the hydrostatic pressure. At that time the concept of pressure was unknown.

== See also ==
- Darcy's law
- Dynamic pressure
- Fluid statics
- Hagen–Poiseuille equation
- Helmholtz's theorems
- Kirchhoff equations
- Knudsen equation
- Manning equation
- Mild-slope equation
- Morison equation
- Navier–Stokes equations
- Oseen flow
- Pascal's law
- Poiseuille's law
- Potential flow
- Pressure
- Static pressure
- Pressure head
- Relativistic Euler equations
- Reynolds decomposition
- Stokes flow
- Stokes stream function
- Stream function
- Streamlines, streaklines and pathlines
