= Carl Barus =

American physicist (1856–1935)

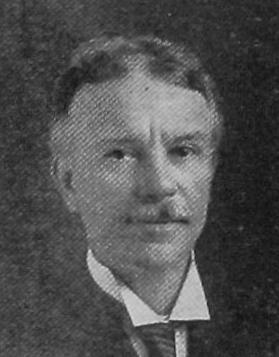
- Carl Barus, 1913
- Born: February 19, 1856; Cincinnati, United States
- Died: September 20, 1935 (aged 79); Providence, Rhode Island, United States
- Education: University of Würzburg
- Known for: Barus effect
- Spouse: Annie Gertrude Howes
- Scientific career
- Fields: Physics
- Doctoral advisor: Friedrich Kohlrausch

Carl Barus (February 19, 1856 – September 20, 1935) was an American physicist and the maternal great-uncle of the American novelist Kurt Vonnegut. The Barus effect is named after him.

Barus was born in Cincinnati, United States. The son of German immigrants (the musician Carl Barus, Sr. and Sophia, nee Möllmann), Barus graduated from Woodward High School, together with William Howard Taft, in 1874.

After high school he studied mining engineering at the Columbia School of Mines, completing a three year course in two years. he moved to Würzburg, Germany, where he studied physics under Friedrich Kohlrausch, and graduated summa cum laude in 1879. He took the degree of Ph.D. in 1880 and would return to America, entering the service of the United States Geological Survey.

Barus married Annie Gertrude Howes on January 20, 1887. They had two children, Maxwell and Deborah. In 1892, he was a member of the American Philosophical Society, and the youngest of all members to National Academy of Sciences. From August 1893 to January 1895 he was a physicist at the Smithsonian Institution, working on aeronautical research.

In June, 1895, he was elected Hazard professor of physics at Brown University. In 1903 he was appointed as a dean of the Brown University Graduate Department, which he was controlling from his office in Wilson Hall. He remained the dean of the graduate school until his retirement in 1926. By that time, the department had grown large enough to become a school within the university which has been attributed to his many contributions. In 1905 he was a corresponding member of Britain and the same year became a member of the First International Congress of Radiology and Electricity at Brussels. The same year, he became a member of the Physikalisch-Medizinische Sozietät at Erlangen. Also, the same year he became the fourth president of American Physical Society, and in 1906, became a member on the advisory board of physics, at the Carnegie Institution of Washington state.

Barus died in Providence, Rhode Island, United States.
