= Conical measure =

Type of laboratory glassware

A conical measure is a type of laboratory glassware which consists of a conical cup with a notch on the top to allow for the easy pouring of liquids, and graduated markings on the side to allow easy and accurate measurement of volumes of liquid.

They may be made of plastic, glass, or borosilicate glass. The use of the conical measure usually dictates its construction material. Plastic conical measures, commonly referred to as measuring cups are used by patients to measure liquid medicaments for oral administration. Glass and borosilicate conical measures are commonly used when compounding by the pharmacy profession.

Conical measures are the most commonly used item of glassware used in the preparation of extemporaneous medicaments. They are not as precise as graduated cylinders for measuring liquids, but make up for this in terms of easy pouring and ability to mix solutions within the measure itself.

== History ==
During his experiments, Abū al-Rayhān al-Bīrūnī (973–1048) invented the conical measure, in order to find the ratio between the weight of a substance in air and the weight of water displaced, and to accurately measure the specific weights of the gemstones and their corresponding metals, which are very close to modern measurements.
