= Die swell =

Property of complex fluids

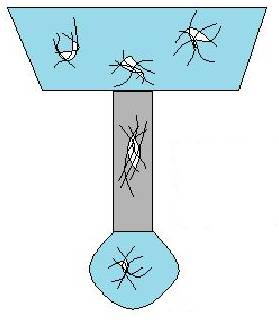
Pre-entrance die: slow flow rate polymers have a roughly spherical conformation..Narrow die: flow rate increases, polymers begin to lengthen in response. Exiting die: Return to slow flow rate. Polymers regain spherical conformation.

In fluid dynamics, the die swell, extrudate swell or Barus effect, is a common phenomenon in polymer processing. Die swell occurs in instances of polymer extrusion, in which a stream of polymeric material is forced through a die, a specialized tool in manufacturing to shape polymeric materials. Die swell is an instance where a polymer stream is compressed by entrance into a die, and is followed by a partial recovery or "swell" back to the former shape and volume of the polymer after exiting the die, hence the term die swell. The Barus effect is named after his discoverer Carl Barus, who published about it in 1893.

== Explanation ==
Die swell is a phenomenon directly related to entropy and the relaxation of the polymer within the flow stream. Initially, a flow stream has a constant rate before entering the die, and the polymers within the stream occupy a roughly spherical conformation, maximizing entropy. Extrusion through the die causes an increase in flow rate through the polymer flow stream. As the polymer spends time inside the die and is subject to the much increased flow rate, the polymers lose the spherical shape, becoming longer due to the increased flow rate. Physical entanglements may relax, if the time scale of the polymer within the die is long enough. When the polymer stream leaves the die, the remaining physical entanglements cause the polymers in the die stream to regain a portion of its former shape and spherical volume, in order to return to the roughly spherical conformation that maximizes entropy.

The disentanglement of polymer chains is a kinetic process, and so the longer the die is, the more time is given for the physical entanglements within the polymer stream to disentangle. With a longer die and a slower polymer flow stream, less pronounced die swell will be observed. This is due to the longer die providing a longer time period for polymer, when subject to the increase flow rate, to disentangle. This characteristic relaxation time determines the length of time the polymer must spend inside the die to minimize die swell.
