= Carl Wilhelm Oseen =

Swedish theoretical physicist (1879–1944)

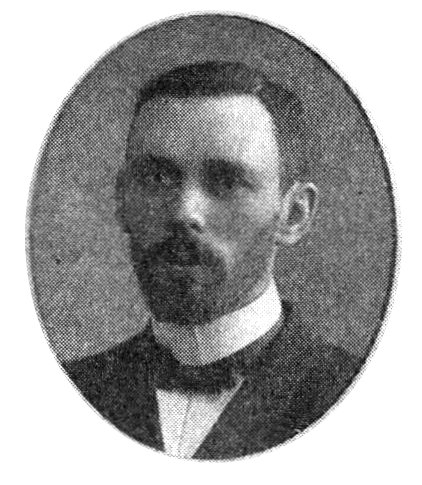
- C. W. Oseen in 1909, when he became professor at Uppsala University.
- Born: 17 April 1879; Lund, Sweden
- Died: 7 November 1944 (aged 65); Stockholm, Sweden
- Education: Lund University
- Known for: Oseen equations; Oseen's approximation; Lamb–Oseen vortex; Basset–Boussinesq–Oseen equation; Ewald–Oseen extinction theorem
- Spouse: Klara Charlotta Strandmark
- Scientific career
- Fields: Theoretical physics
- Workplaces: Lund University; Uppsala University
- Doctoral students: Hannes Alfvén; Hilding Faxén; Erik Hallén

Carl Wilhelm Oseen (17 April 1879 – 7 November 1944) was a Swedish theoretical physicist at Uppsala University, who served as a member of Nobel Committee for Physics from 1922 to 1944.

== Life ==
Oseen was born in Lund. He earned a Fil. Kand. degree (B.Sc.) at Lund University in 1897 and a Filosophie licentiat in 1900. He began practicing as a mathematics associate professor in 1902, and subsequently obtained his PhD a year afterward. He served as interim mathematics professor from 1904 to 1906 and from 1907 to 1910. On September 11, 1909 he became professor of mechanics and mathematical physics at Uppsala University.

Oseen married Klara Charlotta Strandmark (1879 -1943) in Alfshög, Halland, Sweden, on December 30, 1904. They had four children: Birgitta Oseen, born January 4, 1906, Gunnel Oseen, born July 25, 1907, Gärd Oseen, born July 9, 1909, and Jurd Oseen, born March 3,1914. Gärd died at the age of nine on October 14, 1918.

In 1934, Oseen became a member of the American Mathematical Society. He died on 7 November 1944 in Stockholm.

=== Influences ===
He visited Göttingen in the winter of 1900–01, where he attended David Hilbert's lectures on partial differential equations. He was probably also influenced by the other famous mathematician in Göttingen, Felix Klein, and, on a later visit, by the hydrodynamicist Ludwig Prandtl. A great influence was also exercised by his teacher in Lund, A. V. Bäcklund.

== Work ==
Oseen formulated the fundamentals of the elasticity theory of liquid crystals (Oseen elasticity theory), as well as the Oseen equations for viscous fluid flow at small Reynolds numbers. He gave his name to the Oseen tensor and, with Horace Lamb, to the Lamb–Oseen vortex. The Basset–Boussinesq–Oseen (BBO) equation describes the motion of – and forces on – a particle moving in an unsteady flow at low Reynolds numbers.

He was a Plenary Speaker of the ICM in 1936 in Oslo.

== Nobel committee ==
Oseen was a member of the Royal Swedish Academy of Sciences from 1921, and a member of the Academy's Nobel Committee for Physics from 1922. As a full professor of a Swedish university, Oseen also had the right to nominate Nobel Prize winners.

Oseen nominated Albert Einstein for the Nobel Prize in 1921, for Einstein's work on the photoelectric effect (rather than the more controversial theory of general relativity). Einstein was finally awarded the prize for 1921 when Oseen repeated the nomination in 1922.

== Selected bibliography ==
- Oseen, C. W. (1911). "Sur les formules de green généralisées qui se présentent dans l'hydrodynamique et sur quelquesunes de leurs applications". Acta Mathematica. 34: 205–284. doi:10.1007/BF02393128. S2CID 122614175.
- Oseen, C. W. (1914). "Über einen Satz von Green und über die Definitionen von Rot und div". Rendiconti del Circolo Matematico di Palermo. 38: 167–179. doi:10.1007/BF03015189. S2CID 119990517.
- Oseen, C. W. (1924). "Die analytische Theorie der Bewegungsgleichungen einer inkompressiblen zähen Flüssigkeit". Vorträge aus dem Gebiete der Hydro- und Aerodynamik (Innsbruck 1922). pp. 123–135. doi:10.1007/978-3-662-00280-3_10. ISBN 978-3-662-00260-5.
- Oseen, C. W. (1927). Neuere Methoden und Ergebnisse in der Hydrodynamik [Newer Methods and Results in Hydrodynamics] (in German). Berlin: Akademie Verlag.
- Oseen, C. W. (1933). "The theory of liquid crystals". Transactions of the Faraday Society. 29 (140): 883–885. doi:10.1039/tf9332900883.
- Oseen, C. W. (1934). "Über Beziehungen zwischen Potentialtheorie und Liniengeometrie". Mathematische Zeitschrift. 38: 709–729. doi:10.1007/BF01170668. S2CID 122373518.
