= Oseen equations =

Formulae for viscous and incompressible fluid flow at small Reynolds numbers

In fluid dynamics, the Oseen equations (or Oseen flow) describe the flow of a viscous and incompressible fluid at small Reynolds numbers, as formulated by Carl Wilhelm Oseen in 1910. Oseen flow is an improved description of these flows, as compared to Stokes flow, with the (partial) inclusion of convective acceleration.

Oseen's work is based on the experiments of G.G. Stokes, who had studied the falling of a sphere through a viscous fluid. He developed a correction term, which included inertial factors, for the flow velocity used in Stokes' calculations, to solve the problem known as Stokes' paradox. His approximation leads to an improvement to Stokes' calculations.

== Equations ==
The Oseen equations are, in case of an object moving with a steady flow velocity U through the fluid—which is at rest far from the object—and in a frame of reference attached to the object:
$$\begin{align}
-\rho\mathbf{U}\cdot\nabla\mathbf{u} &= -\nabla p\, +\, \mu \nabla^2 \mathbf{u}, \\
\nabla\cdot\mathbf{u} &= 0,
\end{align}$$
where

- u is the disturbance in flow velocity induced by the moving object, i.e. the total flow velocity in the frame of reference moving with the object is −U + u,
- p is the pressure,
- ρ is the density of the fluid,
- μ is the dynamic viscosity,
- ∇ is the gradient operator, and
- ∇^{2} is the Laplace operator.

The boundary conditions for the Oseen flow around a rigid object are:
$$\begin{align}
\mathbf{u} &= \mathbf{U} & & \text{at the object surface}, \\
\mathbf{u} &\to 0 & & \text{and} \quad p \to p_{\infty} \quad \text{for} \quad r \to \infty,
\end{align}$$
with r the distance from the object's center, and p_{∞} the undisturbed pressure far from the object.

== Longitudinal and transversal waves ==
A fundamental property of Oseen's equation is that the general solution can be split into longitudinal and transversal waves.

A solution $\left(\mathbf{u}_\text{L}, p'\right)$ is a longitudinal wave if the velocity is irrotational and hence the viscous term drops out. The equations become
$${\mathbf{u}_\text{L}}_t + U{\mathbf{u}_\text{L}}_x + \frac{1}{\rho}\nabla p = 0, \quad
\nabla \cdot \mathbf{u}_\text{L} = 0, \quad
\nabla \times \mathbf{u}_\text{L} = 0$$

In consequence
$$\mathbf{u}_\text{L} = \nabla\phi, \quad
\nabla^2\phi = 0, \quad
p' = p - p_\infty = -\rho U\mathbf{u}_\text{L}$$

Velocity is derived from potential theory and pressure is from linearized Bernoulli's equations.

A solution $(\mathbf{u}_\text{T}, 0)$ is a transversal wave if the pressure $p'$ is identically zero and the velocity field is solenoidal. The equations are
$${\mathbf{u}_\text{T}}_t + U{\mathbf{u}_\text{T}}_x = \nu\nabla^2\mathbf{u}_\text{T}, \quad
\nabla\cdot\mathbf{u_T} = 0.$$

Then the complete Oseen solution is given by
$$\mathbf{u} = \mathbf{u}_\text{L} + \mathbf{u}_\text{T}$$

a splitting theorem due to Horace Lamb. The splitting is unique if conditions at infinity (say $\mathbf{u} = 0,\ p = p_\infty$) are specified.

For certain Oseen flows, further splitting of transversal wave into irrotational and rotational component is possible $\mathbf{u}_\text{T} = \mathbf{u}_1 + \mathbf{u}_2.$ Let $\chi$ be the scalar function which satisfies $U\chi_x = \nu\nabla^2\chi$ and vanishes at infinity and conversely let $\mathbf{u}_\text{T} = (u_\text{T}, v_\text{T})$ be given such that $\int_{-\infty}^\infty v_\text{T} \, dy = 0$, then the transversal wave is
$$\mathbf{u}_\text{T} = -\frac{\nu}{U}\nabla\chi + \chi\mathbf{i}, \quad
\mathbf{u}_\text{1} = -\frac{\nu}{U}\nabla\chi, \quad
\mathbf{u}_\text{2} = \chi \mathbf{i}.$$
where $\chi$ is determined from $\chi = \frac{U}{\nu} \int_y^\infty v_T \, dy$ and $\mathbf{i}$ is the unit vector. Neither $\mathbf{u}_1$ or $\mathbf{u}_2$ are transversal by itself, but $\mathbf{u}_1 + \mathbf{u}_2$ is transversal. Therefore,
$$\mathbf{u} = \mathbf{u}_\text{L} + \mathbf{u}_\text{T} = \mathbf{u}_\text{L} + \mathbf{u}_1 + \mathbf{u}_2$$

The only rotational component is being $\mathbf{u}_2$.

== Fundamental solutions ==
The fundamental solution due to a singular point force embedded in an Oseen flow is the Oseenlet. The closed-form fundamental solutions for the generalized unsteady Stokes and Oseen flows associated with arbitrary time-dependent translational and rotational motions have been derived for the Newtonian and micropolar fluids.

Using the Oseen equation, Horace Lamb was able to derive improved expressions for the viscous flow around a sphere in 1911, improving on Stokes law towards somewhat higher Reynolds numbers. Also, Lamb derived—for the first time—a solution for the viscous flow around a circular cylinder.

The solution to the response of a singular force $\mathbf{f}$ when no external boundaries are present be written as
$$U \mathbf{u}_x + \frac{1}{\rho}\nabla p -\nu\nabla^2\mathbf{u}=\mathbf{f}, \quad \nabla \cdot \mathbf{u} = 0$$

If $\mathbf{f}=\delta(q,q_o)\mathbf{a}$, where $\delta(q,q_o)$ is the singular force concentrated at the point $q_o$ and $q$ is an arbitrary point and $\mathbf{a}$ is the given vector, which gives the direction of the singular force, then in the absence of boundaries, the velocity and pressure is derived from the fundamental tensor $\Gamma(q,q_o)$ and the fundamental vector $\Pi(q,q_o)$
$$\mathbf{u}(q) = \Gamma(q,q_o) \mathbf{a}, \quad p'=p-p_\infty = \Pi(q,q_o)\cdot\mathbf{a}$$

Now if $\mathbf{f}$ is arbitrary function of space, the solution for an unbounded domain is
$$\mathbf{u}(q) = \int \Gamma(q,q_o) \mathbf{f} (q_o) dq_o, \quad p'(q) =  \int \Pi(q,q_o) \cdot\mathbf{f} (q_o) dq_o$$
where $dq_o$ is the infinitesimal volume/area element around the point $q_o$.

=== Two-dimensional ===
Without loss of generality $q_o=(0,0)$ taken at the origin and $q=(x,y)$. Then the fundamental tensor and vector are
$$\Gamma = \begin{pmatrix}
\frac{\partial A}{\partial x} &  \frac{\partial A}{\partial y} \\
\frac{\partial A}{\partial y} & -\frac{\partial A}{\partial x}
\end{pmatrix} + \frac{1}{2\pi\nu} e^{\lambda x} K_o(\lambda r)
\begin{pmatrix}
1 & 0  \\
0 & 1
\end{pmatrix},\quad
\Pi = \frac{\rho}{2\pi} \nabla (\ln r)$$
where
$$\lambda = \frac{U}{2\nu},\quad
r^2 = x^2 + y^2,\quad
A = -\frac{1}{2\pi U}\left[\ln r + e^{\lambda x} K_o(\lambda r)\right]$$
where $K_o(\lambda r)$ is the modified Bessel function of the second kind of order zero.

=== Three-dimensional ===
Without loss of generality $q_o = (0, 0, 0)$ taken at the origin and $q = (x, y, z)$. Then the fundamental tensor and vector are
$$\Gamma = \begin{pmatrix}
\frac{\partial A}{\partial x} & \frac{\partial B}{\partial x} & \frac{\partial C}{\partial x} \\
\frac{\partial A}{\partial y} & \frac{\partial B}{\partial y} & \frac{\partial C}{\partial y} \\
\frac{\partial A}{\partial z} & \frac{\partial B}{\partial z} & \frac{\partial C}{\partial z}
\end{pmatrix} + \frac{1}{4\pi\nu} \frac{e^{-\lambda(r - x)}}{r}
\begin{pmatrix}
1 & 0 & 0 \\
0 & 1 & 0 \\
0 & 0 & 1
\end{pmatrix},\quad
\Pi = -\frac{\rho}{4\pi} \nabla \left(\frac{1}{r}\right)$$
where

- $\lambda = \frac{U}{2\nu},$
- $r^2 = x^2 + y^2 + z^2,$
- $A = \frac{1}{4\pi U} \frac{1 - e^{-\lambda (r - x)}}{r},$
- $B = -\frac{1}{4\pi U} \frac{\left[1 - e^{-\lambda (r - x)}\right]y}{r(r - x)},$
- $C = -\frac{1}{4\pi U} \frac{\left[1 - e^{-\lambda (r - x)}\right]z}{r(r - x)}$

== Calculations ==
Oseen considered the sphere to be stationary and the fluid to be flowing with a flow velocity ($U$) at an infinite distance from the sphere. Inertial terms were neglected in Stokes' calculations. It is a limiting solution when the Reynolds number tends to zero. When the Reynolds number is small and finite, such as 0.1, correction for the inertial term is needed. Oseen substituted the following flow velocity values into the Navier-Stokes equations.
$$u_1 = u + u_1', \qquad u_2 = u_2', \qquad u_3 = u_3'.$$

Inserting these into the Navier-Stokes equations and neglecting the quadratic terms in the primed quantities leads to the derivation of Oseen's approximation:
$$u{\partial u_1' \over \partial x_1} = -{1 \over \rho}{\partial p \over \partial x_1} + \nu\nabla^2 u_i' \qquad \left({i = 1, 2, 3}\right).$$

Since the motion is symmetric with respect to $x$ axis and the divergence of the vorticity vector is always zero we get:
$$\left(\nabla^2 - {U \over 2v}{\partial \over \partial x}\right) \chi = G(x) = 0$$
the function $G(x)$ can be eliminated by adding to a suitable function in $x$, is the vorticity function, and the previous function can be written as:
$${U \over v}{\partial u' \over \partial x} = \nabla^2 u'$$
and by some integration the solution for $\chi$ is:
$$e^{-Ux \over 2v} \chi = {{Ce^{-U\operatorname{Re} \over 2v}} \over \operatorname{Re}}$$
thus by letting $x$ be the "privileged direction" it produces:
$$\varphi = {A_0 \over \operatorname{Re}} + A_1{\partial \over \partial x}{1 \over \operatorname{Re}} + A_2{\partial^2 \over \partial x^2}{1 \over \operatorname{Re}} + \ldots$$

then by applying the three boundary conditions we obtain
$$C = -{3 \over 2}Ua,\ A_0 = -{3 \over 2}va,\ A_1 = {1 \over 4}Ua^3\ \text{, etc.}$$
the new improved drag coefficient now become:
$$C_\text{d} = {12 \over \operatorname{Re}} \left(1 + {3 \over 8} \operatorname{Re}\right)$$
and finally, when Stokes' solution was solved on the basis of Oseen's approximation, it showed that the resultant drag force is given by
$$F = 6\pi\, \mu\, au\left(1 + {3 \over 8} \operatorname{Re}\right),$$

where:

- $\mathrm{Re} = \rho ua/\mu$ is the Reynolds number based on the radius of the sphere, $a$
- $F$ is the hydrodynamic force
- $u$ is the flow velocity
- $\mu\,$ is the fluid viscosity

The force from Oseen's equation differs from that of Stokes by a factor of
$$1 + {3 \over 8} \mathrm{Re}.$$

== Correction to Stokes' solution ==
The equations for the perturbation read:
$$\begin{align}
\nabla u' &~= 0 \\
u\cdot\nabla u' &~= -\nabla p + \nu\nabla^2 u',
\end{align}$$
but when the velocity field is:
$$\begin{align}
u_y &=  u\cos\theta\left({1 + {a^3 \over 2r^3} - {3a \over 2r}}\right) \\
u_z &= -u\sin\theta\left({1 - {a^3 \over 4r^3} - {3a \over 4r}}\right).
\end{align}$$

In the far field ${r \over a}$ ≫ 1, the viscous stress is dominated by the last term. That is:
$$\nabla^2 u' = O\left({a^3 \over r^3}\right).$$

The inertia term is dominated by the term:
$$u{\partial u' \over \partial z_1} \sim O\left({a^2 \over r^2}\right).$$

The error is then given by the ratio:
$$u {{\partial u' \over \partial z_1} \over {\nu\nabla^2 u'}} = O\left({r \over a}\right).$$

This becomes unbounded for ${r \over a}$ ≫ 1, therefore the inertia cannot be ignored in the far field. By taking the curl, Stokes equation gives $\nabla^2\zeta\, = 0.$ Since the body is a source of vorticity, $\zeta\,$ would become unbounded logarithmically for large ${r \over a}.$ This is certainly unphysical and is known as Stokes' paradox.

== Solution for a moving sphere in incompressible fluid ==
Consider the case of a solid sphere moving in a stationary liquid with a constant velocity. The liquid is modeled as an incompressible fluid (i.e. with constant density), and being stationary means that its velocity tends towards zero as the distance from the sphere approaches infinity.

For a real body there will be a transient effect due to its acceleration as it begins its motion; however after enough time it will tend towards zero, so that the fluid velocity everywhere will approach the one obtained in the hypothetical case in which the body is already moving for infinite time.

Thus we assume a sphere of radius a moving at a constant velocity $\vec{U}$, in an incompressible fluid that is at rest at infinity. We will work in coordinates $\vec{x}_m$ that move along with the sphere with the coordinate center located at the sphere's center. We have:
$$\begin{align}
\vec{u}\left(\left\|{\vec{x}_m}\right\| = a\right) &= \vec{U} \\
\vec{u}\left(\left\|{\vec{x}_m}\right\| \rightarrow \infty\right) &\rightarrow 0
\end{align}$$

Since these boundary conditions, as well as the equation of motions, are time invariant (i.e. they are unchanged by shifting the time $t \rightarrow t + \Delta t$) when expressed in the $\vec{x}_m$ coordinates, the solution depends upon the time only through these coordinates.

The equations of motion are the Navier-Stokes equations defined in the resting frame coordinates $\vec{x} = \vec{x}_m - \vec{U}\cdot t$. While spatial derivatives are equal in both coordinate systems, the time derivative that appears in the equations satisfies:
$$\frac{\partial\vec{u}\left(\vec{x}, t\right)}{\partial t} =
\sum_i{\frac{d{x_m}_i}{dt} \frac{\partial\vec{u}\left(\vec{x}_m\right)}{\partial{x_m}_i}} =
-\left(\vec{U} \cdot \vec{\nabla}_m\right)\vec{u}$$
where the derivative $\vec{\nabla}_m$ is with respect to the moving coordinates $\vec{x}_m$. We henceforth omit the m subscript.

Oseen's approximation sums up to neglecting the term non-linear in $\vec{u}$. Thus the incompressible Navier-Stokes equations become:
$$\left(\vec{U} \cdot \vec{\nabla}\right)\vec{u} + \nu\nabla^2\vec{u} = \frac{1}{\rho}\vec{\nabla}p$$
for a fluid having density ρ and kinematic viscosity ν = μ/ρ (μ being the dynamic viscosity). p is the pressure.

Due to the continuity equation for incompressible fluid $\vec{\nabla} \cdot \vec{u} = 0$, the solution can be expressed using a vector potential $\vec{\psi}$. This turns out to be directed at the $\vec{\varphi}$ direction and its magnitude is equivalent to the stream function used in two-dimensional problems. It turns out to be:
$$\begin{align}
\psi &= Ua^2 \left(-\frac{a}{4r^2}\sin\theta + 3\frac{1 - \cos\theta}{r\sin\theta}\frac{1 - e^{-\frac{Rr}{4a}(1 + \cos\theta)}}{R}\right) \\
\vec{u} &= \vec{\nabla}\times(\psi\hat{\varphi}) = \frac{1}{r\sin\theta}\frac{\partial}{\partial\theta}\left(\psi \sin\theta\right)\hat{r} - \frac{1}{r}\frac{\partial}{\partial r}\left(r\psi\right)\hat{\theta}
\end{align}$$
where $R = 2aU/\nu$ is Reynolds number for the flow close to the sphere.

Note that in some notations $\psi$ is replaced by $\Psi = \psi \cdot r\sin\theta$ so that the derivation of $\vec{u}$ from $\Psi$ is more similar to its derivation from the stream function in the two-dimensional case (in polar coordinates).

=== Elaboration ===
$\psi$ can be expressed as follows:
$$\psi = \psi_1 + \psi_2 - \psi_2 e^{-kr(1 + \cos\theta)}$$

where:
$$\begin{align}
\psi_1 &\equiv -\frac{Ua^3}{4r^2} \sin\theta \\
\psi_2 &\equiv  \frac{3Ua^2}{Rr} \frac{1 - \cos\theta}{\sin\theta}
\end{align}$$
$$k \equiv \frac{R}{4a}$$
, so that $\frac{U}{2k} = \frac{2Ua}{R} = \nu$.

The vector Laplacian of a vector of the type $V(r, \theta)\hat{\varphi}$ reads:
$$\begin{align}
&\nabla^2\left(V(r, \theta)\hat{\varphi}\right) =
\hat{\varphi} \cdot \left(\nabla^2 - \frac{1}{r^2\sin^2\theta}\right)V(r, \theta) =\\
&\hat{\varphi} \cdot \left[
\frac{1}{r^2}\frac{\partial}{\partial r}\left(r^2\frac{\partial}{\partial r}V(r, \theta)\right) +
\frac{1}{r^2\sin\theta}\frac{\partial}{\partial\theta}\left(\sin\theta\frac{\partial}{\partial\theta}V(r, \theta)\right) -
\frac{V(r, \theta)}{r^2\sin^2\theta}
\right]
\end{align}$$.

It can thus be calculated that:
$$\begin{align}
\nabla^2\left(\psi_1\hat{\varphi}\right) &= 0 \\
\nabla^2\left(\psi_2\hat{\varphi}\right) &= 0
\end{align}$$

Therefore:
$$\begin{align}
\nabla^2\vec{\psi}
&= -\nabla^2\left(\psi_2 e^{-kr(1 + \cos\theta)}\hat{\varphi}\right) \\
&= -\left(\psi_2\nabla^2 e^{-kr(1 + \cos\theta)} + 2\frac{\partial\psi_2}{\partial r}\frac{\partial}{\partial r}e^{-kr(1 + \cos\theta)} +
\frac{2}{r^2}\frac{\partial\psi_2}{\partial\theta}\frac{\partial}{\partial\theta}e^{-kr(1 + \cos\theta)}\right)\hat{\varphi} \\
&= -\frac{6Ua^2}{R}\sin\theta\left(\frac{k^2}{r} + \frac{k}{r^2}\right)e^{-kr(1 + \cos\theta)}\hat{\varphi}
\end{align}$$

Thus the vorticity is:
$$\vec{\omega} \equiv \vec{\nabla}\times\vec{u} = -\nabla^2\vec{\psi} =
\frac{6Ua^2}{R}\sin\theta\left(\frac{k^2}{r} + \frac{k}{r^2}\right)e^{-kr(1 + \cos\theta)}\hat{\varphi}$$

where we have used the vanishing of the divergence of $\vec{\psi}$ to relate the vector laplacian and a double curl.

The equation of motion's left hand side is the curl of the following:
$$\left(\vec{U}\cdot\vec{\nabla}\right)\vec{\psi} + \nu\nabla^2\vec{\psi} =
\left(\vec{U}\cdot\vec{\nabla}\right)\vec{\psi} - \nu\vec{\omega}$$

We calculate the derivative separately for each term in $\psi$.

Note that:
$$\vec{U} = U\left(\cos\theta\hat{r} - \sin\theta\hat{\theta}\right)$$

And also:
$$\begin{align}
\frac{\partial\psi_2}{\partial r} &= -\frac{1}{r}\psi_2 \\
\sin\theta\frac{\partial\psi_2}{\partial\theta} &= \psi_2
\end{align}$$

We thus have:
$$\begin{align}
\left(\vec{U} \cdot \vec{\nabla}\right)\left(\psi_1\hat{\varphi}\right)
&= U\left(\cos\theta\frac{\partial \psi_1}{\partial r} - \frac{1}{r}\sin\theta\frac{\partial\psi_1}{\partial\theta}\right)\hat{\varphi}
= \frac{3U^2 a^3}{4r^3}\sin\theta\cos\theta\hat{\varphi} \\
\left(\vec{U} \cdot \vec{\nabla}\right)\left(\psi_2\hat{\varphi}\right)
&= U\left(\cos\theta\frac{\partial \psi_2}{\partial r} - \frac{1}{r}\sin\theta\frac{\partial\psi_2}{\partial\theta}\right)\hat{\varphi}
= -U\frac{1}{r}(1 + \cos\theta)\psi_2\hat{\varphi}
= -\frac{3U^2 a^2}{Rr^2}\sin\theta\hat{\varphi} \\
\left(\vec{U} \cdot \vec{\nabla}\right)\left(-\psi_2 e^{-kr(1 + \cos\theta)}\hat{\varphi}\right)
&= -e^{-kr(1 + \cos\theta)}\left(\left(\vec{U} \cdot \vec{\nabla}\right)\left(\psi_2\hat{\varphi}) + \psi_2\left(\vec{U} \cdot \vec{\nabla}\right)\left(-kr(1 + \cos\theta\right)\hat{\varphi}\right)\right) \\
&= U\psi_2 e^{-kr(1 + \cos\theta)}\left(\frac{1}{r}(1 + \cos\theta) + \cos\theta\frac{\partial(kr(1 + \cos\theta))}{\partial r} - \frac{1}{r}\sin\theta\frac{\partial(kr(1 + \cos\theta))}{\partial\theta}\right)\hat{\varphi} \\
&= U\psi_2(1 + \cos\theta)\left(\frac{1}{r} + k\right)e^{-kr(1 + \cos\theta)}\hat{\varphi}
= \frac{3U^2 a^2}{R}\sin\theta\left(\frac{1}{r^2} + \frac{k}{r}\right)e^{-kr(1 + \cos\theta)}\hat{\varphi} \\
&= \frac{U}{2k}\vec{\omega} = \nu\vec{\omega}
\end{align}$$

Combining all the terms we have:
$$\left(\vec{U} \cdot \vec{\nabla}\right)\vec{\psi} + \nu\nabla^2\vec{\psi} =
\left(\frac{3U^2 a^3}{4r^3}\sin\theta\cos\theta - \frac{3U^2 a^2}{Rr^2}\sin\theta\right)\hat{\varphi}$$

Taking the curl, we find an expression that is equal to $1/\rho$ times the gradient of the following function, which is the pressure:
$$p = p_0 - \frac{3\mu Ua}{2r^2}\cos\theta + \frac{\rho U^2 a^3}{4r^3}\left(3\cos^2\theta - 1\right)$$

where $p_0$ is the pressure at infinity, $\theta$.is the polar angle originated from the opposite side of the front stagnation point ($\theta = \pi$ where is the front stagnation point).

Also, the velocity is derived by taking the curl of $\vec{\psi}$:
$$\vec{u} = U\left[
-\frac{a^3}{2r^3}\cos\theta + \frac{3a^2}{Rr^2}
- \frac{3a^2}{R}\left(\frac{1}{r^2} + \frac{k}{r}[1 - \cos\theta]\right)e^{-kr(1 + \cos\theta)}
\right]\hat{r}
- U\left[\frac{a^3}{4r^3}\sin\theta + \frac{3a^2}{Rr}k\sin\theta e^{-kr(1 + \cos\theta)}\right]\hat{\theta}$$

These p and u satisfy the equation of motion and thus constitute the solution to Oseen's approximation.

== Modifications to Oseen's approximation ==
One may question, however, whether the correction term was chosen by chance, because in a frame of reference moving with the sphere, the fluid near the sphere is almost at rest, and in that region inertial force is negligible and Stokes' equation is well justified. Far away from the sphere, the flow velocity approaches u and Oseen's approximation is more accurate. But Oseen's equation was obtained applying the equation for the entire flow field. This question was answered by Proudman and Pearson in 1957, who solved the Navier-Stokes equations and gave an improved Stokes' solution in the neighborhood of the sphere and an improved Oseen's solution at infinity, and matched the two solutions in a supposed common region of their validity. They obtained:

$$F = 6\pi\,\mu\,a U\left(1 + {3 \over 8} \operatorname{Re} + {9 \over 40} \operatorname{Re}^2 \ln \operatorname{Re} + \mathcal{O}\left(\operatorname{Re}^2\right)\right).$$

== Applications ==
The method and formulation for analysis of flow at a very low Reynolds number is important. The slow motion of small particles in a fluid is common in bio-engineering. Oseen's drag formulation can be used in connection with flow of fluids under various special conditions, such as: containing particles, sedimentation of particles, centrifugation or ultracentrifugation of suspensions, colloids, and blood through isolation of tumors and antigens. The fluid does not even have to be a liquid, and the particles do not need to be solid. It can be used in a number of applications, such as smog formation and atomization of liquids.

Blood flow in small vessels, such as capillaries, is characterized by small Reynolds and Womersley numbers. A vessel of diameter of 10 µm with a flow of 1 millimetre/second, viscosity of 0.02 poise for blood, density of 1 g/cm^{3} and a heart rate of 2 Hz, will have a Reynolds number of 0.005 and a Womersley number of 0.0126. At these small Reynolds and Womersley numbers, the viscous effects of the fluid become predominant. Understanding the movement of these particles is essential for drug delivery and studying metastasis movements of cancers.
