= Laplace equation for irrotational flow =

Differential equation in fluid mechanics

Irrotational flow exists in any region of a fluid flow field where the curl of the velocity is zero. That is when
$$\nabla\times \vec{v} = 0$$

Similarly, if it is assumed that the fluid is incompressible:
$$\rho(x,y,z,t) = \rho \text{ (a constant)}$$

Then, starting with the continuity equation:
$$\frac{\partial \rho}{\partial t} + \nabla\cdot(\rho\vec{v}) = 0$$

The condition of incompressibility means that the time derivative of the density is 0, and that the density can be pulled out of the divergence, and divided out, thus leaving the continuity equation for an incompressible system:
$$\nabla\cdot\vec{v} = 0$$

Now, the Helmholtz decomposition can be used to write the velocity as the sum of the gradient of a scalar potential and as the curl of a vector potential. That is:
$$\vec{v} = -\nabla\phi + \nabla\times\vec{A}$$

Note that imposing the condition that $\nabla\times\vec{v} = 0$ implies that
$$\nabla\times(\nabla\times \vec{A}) = 0$$

The curl of the gradient is always 0. Note that the curl of the curl of a function is only uniformly 0 for the vector potential being 0 itself. So, by the condition of irrotational flow:
$$\vec{v} = -\nabla\phi$$

And then using the continuity equation $\nabla\cdot\vec{v} = 0$, the scalar potential can be substituted back in to find Laplace's Equation for irrotational flow:

$\nabla^2\phi = 0 \,$

Note that the Laplace equation is a well-studied linear partial differential equation. Its solutions are infinite; however, most solutions can be discarded when considering physical systems, as boundary conditions completely determine the velocity potential.

Examples of common boundary conditions include the velocity of the fluid, determined by $\vec{v}= -\nabla\phi$, being 0 on the boundaries of the system.

There is a great amount of overlap with electromagnetism when solving this equation in general, as the Laplace equation also models the electrostatic potential in a vacuum.

There are many reasons to study irrotational flow, among them;

- Many real-world problems contain large regions of irrotational flow.
- It can be studied analytically.
- It shows the importance of boundary layers and viscous forces.
- It provides tools for studying concepts of lift and drag.

== See also ==
- Irrotational vector fields
- Irrotational vortices
- Potential flow around a circular cylinder
- Potential flow around an airfoil section
