= Laplacian vector field =

In vector calculus, a Laplacian vector field is a vector field which is both irrotational and incompressible. If the field is denoted as v, then it is described by the following differential equations:

$$\begin{align}
\nabla \times \mathbf{v} &= \mathbf{0}, \\
\nabla \cdot \mathbf{v} &= 0.
\end{align}$$

== Laplace's equation ==
From the vector calculus identity $\nabla^2 \mathbf{v} \equiv \nabla (\nabla\cdot \mathbf{v}) - \nabla\times (\nabla\times \mathbf{v})$ it follows that

$$\nabla^2 \mathbf{v} = \mathbf{0}$$

that is, that the field v satisfies Laplace's equation.

However, the converse is not true; not every vector field that satisfies Laplace's equation is a Laplacian vector field, which can be a point of confusion. For example, the vector field ${\bf v} = (xy, yz, zx)$ satisfies Laplace's equation, but it has both nonzero divergence and nonzero curl and is not a Laplacian vector field.

== Cauchy-Riemann equations ==
A Laplacian vector field in the plane satisfies the Cauchy–Riemann equations: it is holomorphic.

== Potential of Laplacian field ==
Suppose the curl of $\mathbf{u}$ is zero, it follows that (when the domain of definition is simply connected) $\mathbf{u}$ can be expressed as the gradient of a scalar potential (see irrotational field) which we define as $\phi$:

$$\mathbf{u} = \nabla \phi \qquad \qquad (1)$$

since it is always true that $\nabla \times \nabla \phi = 0$.

Other forms of $\mathbf{u} = \nabla \phi$ can be expressed as

$u_{i} = \frac{\partial \phi}{\partial x _{1}} \quad ; \quad u = \frac{\partial \phi}{\partial x}, v = \frac{\partial \phi}{\partial y}, w = \frac{\partial \phi}{\partial z}$.

When the field is incompressible, then

$\nabla \cdot u = 0 \quad \textrm{or} \quad \frac{\partial u_{j}}{\partial x_{j}} = 0 \quad \textrm{or} \quad \frac{\partial u}{\partial x} + \frac{\partial v}{\partial y} +\frac{\partial w}{\partial z} = 0$.

And substituting equation 1 into the equation above yields

$\nabla^2 \phi = 0.$

Therefore, the potential of a Laplacian field satisfies Laplace's equation.

== Potential flow theory ==
The Laplacian vector field has an impactful application in fluid dynamics. Consider the Laplacian vector field to be the velocity potential $\phi$ which is both irrotational and incompressible.

Irrotational flow is a flow where the vorticity, $\omega$, is zero, and since $\omega = \nabla \times u$, it follows that the condition $\omega = 0$ is satisfied by defining a quantity called the velocity potential $\phi$, such that $u = \nabla \phi$, since $\nabla \times \nabla \phi = 0$ always holds true.

Irrotational flow is also called potential flow.

If the fluid is incompressible, then conservation of mass requires that

$\nabla \cdot u = 0 \quad \textrm{or} \quad \frac{\partial u_{j}}{\partial x_{j}} = 0 \quad \textrm{or} \quad \frac{\partial u}{\partial x} + \frac{\partial v}{\partial y} + \frac{\partial w}{\partial z} = 0$.

And substituting the previous equation into the above equation yields $\nabla ^2 \phi = 0$ which satisfies the Laplace equation.

In planar flow, the stream function $\psi$ can be defined with the following equations for incompressible planar flow in the xy-plane:

$u = \frac{\partial \psi}{\partial y} \quad \textrm{and} \quad v = -\frac{\partial \psi}{\partial x}$.

When we also take into consideration $u = \frac{\partial \phi}{\partial x} \quad \textrm{and} \quad v = \frac{\partial \phi}{\partial y}$, we are looking at the Cauchy-Reimann equations.

These equations imply several characteristics of an incompressible planar potential flow. The lines of constant velocity potential are perpendicular to the streamlines (lines of constant $\psi$) everywhere.

== See also ==
- Potential flow
- Harmonic function
