= Joukowsky transform =

In mathematics, a type of conformal map

Example of a Joukowsky transform. The circle above is transformed into the Joukowsky airfoil below.

In applied mathematics, the Joukowsky transform (sometimes transliterated Joukovsky, Joukowski or Zhukovsky) is a conformal map historically used to understand some principles of airfoil design. It is named after Nikolai Zhukovsky, who published it in 1910.

The transform and its right-inverse are

$$z = \zeta + \frac{1}{\zeta},\qquad \zeta=\tfrac12z \pm\sqrt{\bigl(\tfrac12z\bigr)^2-1} = \frac1{\tfrac12z\mp\sqrt{\bigl(\tfrac12z\bigr)^2-1}},$$

where $z = x + iy$ is a complex variable in the new space and $\zeta = \chi + i \eta$ is a complex variable in the original space. The right-inverse is not a global left-inverse because $\zeta\mapsto z$ is 2-to-1; but a local left-inverse is always one of the right-inverse branches.

In aerodynamics, the transform is used to solve for the two-dimensional potential flow around a class of airfoils known as Joukowsky airfoils. A Joukowsky airfoil is generated in the complex plane ($z$-plane) by applying the Joukowsky transform to a circle in the $\zeta$-plane. The coordinates of the centre of the circle are variables, and varying them modifies the shape of the resulting airfoil. The circle encloses the point $\zeta = -1$ (where the derivative is zero) and intersects the point $\zeta = 1.$ This can be achieved for any allowable centre position $\mu_x + i\mu_y$ by varying the radius of the circle.

Joukowsky airfoils have a cusp at their trailing edge. A closely related conformal mapping, the Kármán–Trefftz transform, generates the broader class of Kármán–Trefftz airfoils by controlling the trailing edge angle. When a trailing edge angle of zero is specified, the Kármán–Trefftz transform reduces to the Joukowsky transform.

== General Joukowsky transform ==
The Joukowsky transform of any complex number $\zeta$ to $z$ is as follows:

$$\begin{align}
z &= x + iy = \zeta + \frac{1}{\zeta} \\
&= \chi + i \eta + \frac{1}{\chi + i\eta} \\[2pt]
&= \chi + i \eta + \frac{\chi - i\eta}{\chi^2 + \eta^2} \\[2pt]
&= \chi\left(1 + \frac1{\chi^2 + \eta^2}\right) + i\eta\left(1 - \frac1{\chi^2 + \eta^2}\right).
\end{align}$$

So the real ($x$) and imaginary ($y$) components are:

$$\begin{align}
x &= \chi\left(1 + \frac1{\chi^2 + \eta^2}\right), \\[2pt]
y &= \eta\left(1 - \frac1{\chi^2 + \eta^2}\right).
\end{align}$$

=== Sample Joukowsky airfoil ===
The transformation of all complex numbers on the unit circle is a special case.

$$|\zeta| = \sqrt{\chi^2 + \eta^2} = 1,$$

which gives

$$\chi^2 + \eta^2 = 1.$$

So the real component becomes $x = \chi (1 + 1) = 2\chi$ and the imaginary component becomes $y = \eta (1 - 1) = 0$.

Thus the complex unit circle maps to a flat plate on the real-number line from −2 to +2.

Transformations from other circles make a wide range of airfoil shapes.

== Velocity field and circulation for the Joukowsky airfoil ==
The solution to potential flow around a circular cylinder is analytic and well known. It is the superposition of uniform flow, a doublet, and a vortex.

The complex conjugate velocity $\widetilde{W} = \widetilde{u}_x - i\widetilde{u}_y,$ around the circle in the $\zeta$-plane is
$$\widetilde{W} = V_\infty e^{-i\alpha} + \frac{i\Gamma}{2\pi(\zeta - \mu)} - \frac{V_\infty R^2 e^{i\alpha}}{(\zeta - \mu)^2},$$

where

- $\mu = \mu_x + i \mu_y$ is the complex coordinate of the centre of the circle,
- $V_\infty$ is the freestream velocity of the fluid,

$\alpha$ is the angle of attack of the airfoil with respect to the freestream flow,

- $R$ is the radius of the circle, calculated using $R = \sqrt{\left(1 - \mu_x\right)^2 + \mu_y^2}$,
- $\Gamma$ is the circulation, found using the Kutta condition, which reduces in this case to
  $$\Gamma = 4\pi V_\infty R\sin\left(\alpha + \sin^{-1}\frac{\mu_y}{R}\right).$$

The complex velocity $W$ around the airfoil in the $z$-plane is, according to the rules of conformal mapping and using the Joukowsky transformation,
$$W = \frac{\widetilde{W}}{\frac{dz}{d\zeta}} = \frac{\widetilde{W}}{1 - \frac{1}{\zeta^2}}.$$

Here $W = u_x - i u_y,$ with $u_x$ and $u_y$ the velocity components in the $x$ and $y$ directions respectively ($z = x + iy,$ with $x$ and $y$ real-valued). From this velocity, other properties of interest of the flow, such as the coefficient of pressure and lift per unit of span can be calculated.

== Kármán–Trefftz transform ==
Example of a Kármán–Trefftz transform. The circle above in the $\zeta$-plane is transformed into the Kármán–Trefftz airfoil below, in the $z$-plane. The parameters used are: $\mu_x = -0.08,$ $\mu_y = +0.08$ and $n = 1.94.$ Note that the airfoil in the $z$-plane has been normalised using the chord length.

The Kármán–Trefftz transform is a conformal map closely related to the Joukowsky transform. While a Joukowsky airfoil has a cusped trailing edge, a Kármán–Trefftz airfoil—which is the result of the transform of a circle in the $\zeta$-plane to the physical $z$-plane, analogue to the definition of the Joukowsky airfoil—has a non-zero angle at the trailing edge, between the upper and lower airfoil surface. The Kármán–Trefftz transform therefore requires an additional parameter: the trailing-edge angle $\alpha.$ This transform is

$z = nb \frac{(\zeta + b)^n + (\zeta - b)^n}{(\zeta + b)^n - (\zeta - b)^n},$	A

where $b$ is a real constant that determines the positions where $dz/d\zeta = 0$, and $n$ is slightly smaller than 2. The angle $\alpha$ between the tangents of the upper and lower airfoil surfaces at the trailing edge is related to $n$ as

$$\alpha = 2\pi - n\pi, \quad n = 2 - \frac{\alpha}{\pi}.$$

The derivative $dz/d\zeta$, required to compute the velocity field, is

$$\frac{dz}{d\zeta} = \frac{4n^2}{\zeta^2 - 1}
\frac{\left(1 + \frac{1}{\zeta}\right)^n \left(1 - \frac{1}{\zeta}\right)^n}
{\left[\left(1 + \frac{1}{\zeta}\right)^n - \left(1 - \frac{1}{\zeta}\right)^n \right]^2}.$$

=== Background ===
First, add and subtract 2 from the Joukowsky transform, as given above:

$$\begin{align}
z + 2 &= \zeta + 2 + \frac{1}{\zeta} = \frac{1}{\zeta} (\zeta + 1)^2, \\[3pt]
z - 2 &= \zeta - 2 + \frac{1}{\zeta} = \frac{1}{\zeta} (\zeta - 1)^2.
\end{align}$$

Dividing the left and right hand sides gives

$$\frac{z - 2}{z + 2} = \left( \frac{\zeta - 1}{\zeta + 1} \right)^2.$$

The right hand side contains (as a factor) the simple second-power law from potential flow theory, applied at the trailing edge near $\zeta = +1.$ From conformal mapping theory, this quadratic map is known to change a half plane in the $\zeta$-space into potential flow around a semi-infinite straight line. Further, values of the power less than 2 will result in flow around a finite angle. So, by changing the power in the Joukowsky transform to a value slightly less than 2, the result is a finite angle instead of a cusp. Replacing 2 by $n$ in the previous equation gives

$$\frac{z - n}{z + n} = \left( \frac{\zeta - 1}{\zeta + 1} \right)^n,$$

which is the Kármán–Trefftz transform. Solving for $z$ gives it in the form of equation A.

== Symmetrical Joukowsky airfoils ==
In 1943 Hsue-shen Tsien published a transform of a circle of radius $a$ into a symmetrical airfoil that depends on parameter $\epsilon$ and angle of inclination $\alpha$:

$$z = e^{i\alpha} \left(\zeta - \epsilon + \frac{1}{\zeta - \epsilon} + \frac{2\epsilon^2}{a + \epsilon}\right).$$

The parameter $\epsilon$ yields a flat plate when zero, and a circle when infinite; thus it corresponds to the thickness of the airfoil. Furthermore the radius of the cylinder $a=1+\epsilon$.
