= Riabouchinsky solid =

Fluid mechanics technique

In fluid mechanics a Riabouchinsky solid is a technique used for approximating boundary layer separation from a bluff body using potential flow. It is named after Dimitri Pavlovitch Riabouchinsky.

Riabouchinsky solids are typically used for analysing the behaviour of bodies moving through otherwise quiescent fluid (examples would include moving cars, or buildings in a windfield).

Typically the streamline that touches the edge of the body is modelled as having no transverse pressure gradient and thus may be styled as a free surface after separation.

The use of Riabouchinsky solids renders d'Alembert's paradox void; the technique typically gives reasonable estimates for the drag offered by bluff bodies moving through inviscid fluids.
