= Pressure coefficient =

Dimensionless number describing relative pressures in a fluid flow field

In fluid dynamics, the pressure coefficient is a dimensionless number which describes the relative pressures throughout a flow field. The pressure coefficient is used in aerodynamics and hydrodynamics. Every point in a fluid flow field has its own unique pressure coefficient, C_{p}.

In many situations in aerodynamics and hydrodynamics, the pressure coefficient at a point near a body is independent of body size. Consequently, an engineering model can be tested in a wind tunnel or water tunnel, pressure coefficients can be determined at critical locations around the model, and these pressure coefficients can be used with confidence to predict the fluid pressure at those critical locations around a full-size aircraft or boat.

== Definition ==
The pressure coefficient is a parameter for studying both incompressible/compressible fluids such as water and air. The relationship between the dimensionless coefficient and the dimensional numbers is
$$C_p = \frac{p - p_\infty}{\frac{1}{2} \rho_\infty V_\infty^2},$$
where

$p$ is the static pressure at the point at which pressure coefficient is being evaluated,
$p_\infty$ is the static pressure in the freestream (i.e. remote from any disturbance),
$\rho_\infty$ is the freestream fluid density (1.225 kg/m^{3} for air at sea level and 15 °C),
$V_\infty$ is the freestream velocity of the fluid, or the velocity of the body through the fluid.

== Incompressible flow ==
Using Bernoulli's equation, the pressure coefficient can be further simplified for potential flows (inviscid, and steady):

$$C_p|_{M \, \approx \, 0} = {p - p_\infty \over p_0 - p_\infty } = {1 - \bigg(\frac{u}{u_{\infty}} \bigg)^2}$$

where:

$u$ is the flow speed at the point at which pressure coefficient is being evaluated
$M$ is the Mach number, which is taken in the limit of zero
$p_0$ is the flow's stagnation pressure

This relationship is valid for the flow of incompressible fluids where variations in speed and pressure are sufficiently small that variations in fluid density can be neglected. This assumption is commonly made in engineering practice when the Mach number is less than about 0.3.

- $C_p$ of zero indicates the pressure is the same as the freestream pressure.
- $C_p$ of one corresponds to the stagnation pressure and indicates a stagnation point.
- the most negative values of $C_p$ in a liquid flow can be summed to the cavitation number to give the cavitation margin. If this margin is positive, the flow is locally fully liquid, while if it is zero or negative the flow is cavitating or gas.

Locations where $C_p = -1$ are significant in the design of gliders because this indicates a suitable location for a "Total energy" port for supply of signal pressure to the Variometer, a special Vertical Speed Indicator which reacts to vertical movements of the atmosphere but does not react to vertical maneuvering of the glider.

In an incompressible fluid flow field around a body, there will be points having positive pressure coefficients up to one, and negative pressure coefficients including coefficients less than minus one.

== Compressible flow ==
In the flow of compressible fluids such as air, and particularly the high-speed flow of compressible fluids, ${\frac{1}{2}\rho v^2}$ (the dynamic pressure) is no longer an accurate measure of the difference between stagnation pressure and static pressure. Also, the familiar relationship that stagnation pressure is equal to total pressure does not always hold true. (It is always true in isentropic flow, but the presence of shock waves can cause the flow to depart from isentropic.) As a result, pressure coefficients can be greater than one in compressible flow.

=== Perturbation theory ===
The pressure coefficient $C_p$ can be estimated for irrotational and isentropic flow by introducing the potential $\Phi$ and the perturbation potential $\phi$, normalized by the free-stream velocity $u_{\infty}$

$$\Phi = u_{\infty}x + \phi(x, y, z)$$

Using Bernoulli's equation,

$$\frac{\partial \Phi}{\partial t} + \frac{\nabla \Phi \cdot \nabla \Phi}{2} + \frac{\gamma}{\gamma-1}\frac{p}{\rho} = \text{constant}$$

which can be rewritten as

$$\frac{\partial \Phi}{\partial t} + \frac{\nabla \Phi \cdot \nabla \Phi}{2} + \frac{a^2}{\gamma-1}= \text{constant}$$

where $a$ is the sound speed.

The pressure coefficient becomes

$$\begin{align}
C_p &= \frac{p-p_{\infty}}{\frac{\gamma}{2}p_{\infty} M^2} =\frac{2}{\gamma M^2}\left[\left(\frac{a}{a_{\infty}}\right)^{\frac{2\gamma}{\gamma-1}} -1\right]\\
&= \frac{2}{\gamma M^2}\left[\left(\frac{\gamma-1}{a_{\infty}^2}(\frac{u_{\infty}^2}{2} - \Phi_t - \frac{\nabla\Phi\cdot\nabla\Phi}{2}) + 1\right)^{\frac{\gamma}{\gamma-1}} -1\right]\\
&\approx \frac{2}{\gamma M^2}\left[\left(1 - \frac{\gamma-1}{a_{\infty}^2}(\phi_t + u_{\infty}\phi_x )\right)^{\frac{\gamma}{\gamma-1}} -1\right]\\
&\approx -\frac{2\phi_t}{u_{\infty}^2} - \frac{2\phi_x}{u_{\infty}}
\end{align}$$

where $a_{\infty}$ is the far-field sound speed.

=== Local piston theory ===
The classical piston theory is a powerful aerodynamic tool. From the use of the momentum equation and the assumption of isentropic perturbations, one obtains the following basic piston theory formula for the surface pressure:

$$p = p_{\infty}\left(1 + \frac{\gamma-1}{2}\frac{w}{a}\right)^{\frac{2\gamma}{\gamma-1}}$$

where $w$ is the downwash speed and $a$ is the sound speed.

$$C_p = \frac{p-p_{\infty}}{\frac{\gamma}{2}p_{\infty} M^2} = \frac{2}{\gamma M^2}\left[\left(1 + \frac{\gamma-1}{2}\frac{w}{a}\right)^{\frac{2\gamma}{\gamma-1}} - 1\right]$$

The surface is defined as

$$F(x,y,z,t)= z - f(x,y,t) = 0$$

The slip velocity boundary condition leads to

$$\frac{\nabla F}{|\nabla F|}(u_{\infty} + \phi_x,\phi_y,\phi_z) = V_{\text{wall}}\cdot \frac{\nabla F}{|\nabla F|}  = -\frac{\partial F}{\partial t}\frac{1}{|\nabla F|}$$

The downwash speed $w$ is approximated as

$$w = \frac{\partial f}{\partial t} + u_{\infty} \frac{\partial f}{\partial x}$$

== Hypersonic flow ==
In hypersonic flow, the pressure coefficient can be accurately calculated for a vehicle using Newton's corpuscular theory of fluid motion, which is inaccurate for low-speed flow and relies on three assumptions:

1. The flow can be modeled as a stream of particles in rectilinear motion
2. Upon impact with a surface, all normal momentum is lost
3. All tangential momentum is conserved, and flow follows the body

For a freestream velocity $V_{\infty}$ impacting a surface of area $A$, which is inclined at an angle $\theta$ relative to the freestream, the change in normal momentum is $V_{\infty}\sin\theta$ and the mass flux incident on the surface is $\rho_{\infty}V_{\infty} A \sin \theta$, with $\rho_{\infty}$ being the freestream air density. Then the momentum flux, equal to the force exerted on the surface $F$, from Newton's second law is equal to:

$$F = (\rho_{\infty}V_{\infty}A\sin\theta)(V_{\infty}\sin\theta) = \rho_{\infty}V_{\infty}^{2} A \sin^{2}\theta$$

Dividing by the surface area, it is clear that the force per unit area is equal to the pressure difference between the surface pressure $p$ and the freestream pressure $p_{\infty}$, leading to the relation:

$$\frac{F}{A} = p - p_{\infty} = \rho_{\infty}V_{\infty}^{2} \sin^{2}\theta \implies \frac{p - p_{\infty}}{ \frac{1}{2} \rho_{\infty}V_{\infty}^{2}} = 2\sin^{2}\theta$$

The last equation may be identified as the pressure coefficient, meaning that Newtonian theory predicts that the pressure coefficient in hypersonic flow is:

$$C_{p} = 2\sin^{2}\theta$$

For very high speed flows, and vehicles with sharp surfaces, the Newtonian theory works very well.

=== Modified Newtonian law ===
A modification to the Newtonian theory, specifically for blunt bodies, was proposed by Lester Lees:

$$C_{p} = C_{p,\max}\sin^{2}\theta$$

where $C_{p,\max}$ is the maximum value of the pressure coefficient at the stagnation point behind a normal shock wave:

$$C_{p,\max} = \frac{p_{o} - p_{\infty}}{ \frac{1}{2}\rho_{\infty}V_{\infty}^{2} } = \frac{p_{\infty}}{\frac{1}{2}\rho_{\infty}V_{\infty}^{2}} \left( \frac{p_{o}}{p_{\infty}} - 1 \right) = \frac{2}{\gamma M_{\infty}^{2} } \left( \frac{p_{o}}{p_{\infty}} - 1 \right)$$

where $p_{o}$ is the stagnation pressure and $\gamma$ is the ratio of specific heats. The last relation is obtained from the ideal gas law $p = \rho RT$, Mach number $M = V/a$, and speed of sound $a = \sqrt{\gamma RT}$. The Rayleigh pitot tube formula for a calorically perfect normal shock says that the ratio of the stagnation and freestream pressure is:

$$\frac{p_{o}}{p_{\infty}} = \left[ \frac{(\gamma+1)^{2}M_{\infty}^{2}}{4\gamma M_{\infty}^{2} - 2(\gamma-1)} \right]^{\gamma/(\gamma-1)} \left[ \frac{\gamma(2M_{\infty}^{2} - 1) + 1}{\gamma + 1} \right]$$

Therefore, it follows that the maximum pressure coefficient for the Modified Newtonian law is:

$$C_{p,\max} = \frac{2}{\gamma M_{\infty}^{2} } \left\{ \left[ \frac{(\gamma+1)^{2}M_{\infty}^{2}}{4\gamma M_{\infty}^{2} - 2(\gamma-1)} \right]^{\gamma/(\gamma-1)} \left[ \frac{\gamma(2M_{\infty}^{2} - 1) + 1}{\gamma + 1} \right] - 1 \right\}$$

In the limit when $M_{\infty} \rightarrow \infty$, the maximum pressure coefficient becomes:

$$C_{p,\max} = \left[ \frac{(\gamma+1)^{2}}{4\gamma} \right]^{\gamma/(\gamma-1)} \left( \frac{4}{\gamma + 1} \right)$$

And as $\gamma \rightarrow 1$, $C_{p,\max} = 2$, recovering the pressure coefficient from Newtonian theory at very high speeds. The modified Newtonian theory is substantially more accurate than the Newtonian model for calculating the pressure distribution over blunt bodies.

== Pressure distribution ==
An airfoil at a given angle of attack will have what is called a pressure distribution. This pressure distribution is simply the pressure at all points around an airfoil. Typically, graphs of these distributions are drawn so that negative numbers are higher on the graph, as the $C_p$ for the upper surface of the airfoil will usually be farther below zero and will hence be the top line on the graph.

== Relationship with aerodynamic coefficients ==
All the three aerodynamic coefficients are integrals of the pressure coefficient curve along the chord. The coefficient of lift for a two-dimensional airfoil section with strictly horizontal surfaces can be calculated from the coefficient of pressure distribution by integration, or calculating the area between the lines on the distribution. This expression is not suitable for direct numeric integration using the panel method of lift approximation, as it does not take into account the direction of pressure-induced lift. This equation is true only for zero angle of attack.

$$C_l=\frac{1}{x_{TE}-x_{LE}}\int\limits_{x_{LE}}^{x_{TE}}\left(C_{p_l}(x)-C_{p_u}(x)\right)dx$$

where:

$C_{p_l}$ is pressure coefficient on the lower surface
$C_{p_u}$ is pressure coefficient on the upper surface
$x_{LE}$ is the leading edge location
$x_{TE}$ is the trailing edge location

When the lower surface $C_p$ is higher (more negative) on the distribution it counts as a negative area as this will be producing down force rather than lift.

== See also ==
- Lift coefficient
- Drag coefficient
- Pitching moment coefficient
