= Dimitri Riabouchinsky =

Russian physicist (1882–1962)

- Дми́трий Па́влович Рябуши́нский
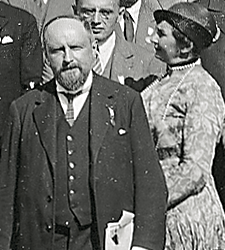
- Dimitri Riabouchinsky and his wife at the International Mathematical Congress, Zürich 1932
- Born: Dimitri Pavlovitch Riabouchinsky; 6 November 1882; Moscow, Russian Empire
- Died: 22 August 1962 (aged 79); Paris, France
- Education: University of Paris
- Known for: Discovery of the Riabouchinsky solid technique and founding of the Institute of Aerodynamics
- Spouse: Vera Sergeevna (Zybina) Riabouchinsky (m. 1906; died 1952)
- Scientific career
- Fields: Fluid dynamics
- Thesis: Recherches d'hydrodynamique (1922)
- Doctoral advisors: Henri Villat; Gabriel Xavier Paul Koenigs
- Other academic advisors: Nikolay Zhukovsky
- Notable students: Konstantin Voronjec

Dimitri Pavlovitch Riabouchinsky (Russian: Дми́трий Па́влович Рябуши́нский,6 November 1882– 22 August 1962) was a Russian fluid dynamicist noted for his discovery of the Riabouchinsky solid technique. With the aid of Nikolay Zhukovsky he founded the Institute of Aerodynamics in 1904, the first in Europe. He also independently discovered equivalent results to the Buckingham Pi Theorem in 1911.

Riabouchinsky left Russia following the October Revolution and his short-term arrest, spending the rest of his life in Paris. He never accepted the French citizenship and, instead, used his Nansen passport up until death. He was a member of the Moscow State University, the University of Paris, the French Academy of Sciences as well as one of the co-founders of the Russian Higher Technical School in France.

Over 200 scientific works were published during his lifetime. He was an Invited Speaker of the ICM in 1920 at Strasbourg, in 1928 at Bologna, and in 1932 at Zurich.
