= Stagnation point =

Where a fluid's velocity is zero

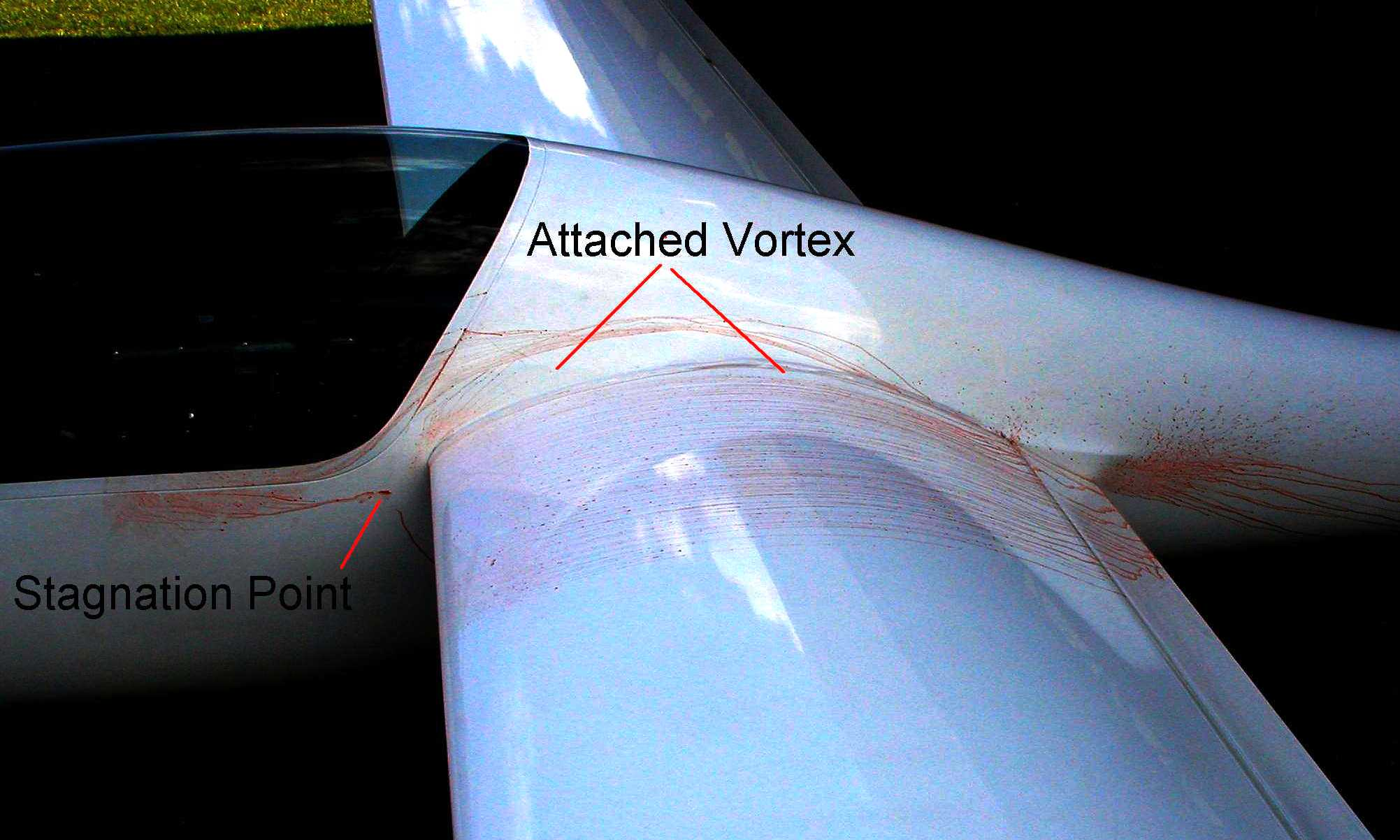
Photo showing stagnation point and attached vortex at an un-faired wing-root to fuselage junction on a Schempp-Hirth Janus C glider

In fluid dynamics, a stagnation point is a point in a flow field where the local velocity of the fluid is zero. The Bernoulli equation shows that the static pressure is highest when the velocity is zero and hence static pressure is at its maximum value at stagnation points: in this case static pressure equals stagnation pressure.

The Bernoulli equation applicable to incompressible flow shows that the stagnation pressure is equal to the dynamic pressure and static pressure combined. In compressible flows, stagnation pressure is also equal to total pressure as well, provided that the fluid entering the stagnation point is brought to rest isentropically.

A plentiful, albeit surprising, example of such points seem to appear in all but the most extreme cases of fluid dynamics in the form of the "no-slip condition" - the assumption that any portion of a flow field lying along some boundary consists of nothing but stagnation points (the question as to whether this assumption reflects reality or is simply a mathematical convenience has been a continuous subject of debate since the principle was first established).

== Pressure coefficient ==
This information can be used to show that the pressure coefficient $C_p$ at a stagnation point is unity (positive one):

$$C_p={p-p_\infty \over q_\infty}$$

where:

$C_p$ is pressure coefficient
$p$ is static pressure at the point at which pressure coefficient is being evaluated
$p_\infty$ is static pressure at points remote from the body (freestream static pressure)
$q_\infty$ is dynamic pressure at points remote from the body (freestream dynamic pressure)

Stagnation pressure minus freestream static pressure is equal to freestream dynamic pressure; therefore the pressure coefficient $C_p$ at stagnation points is +1.

== Kutta condition ==
On a streamlined body fully immersed in a potential flow, there are two stagnation points—one near the leading edge and one near the trailing edge. On a body with a sharp point such as the trailing edge of a wing, the Kutta condition specifies that a stagnation point is located at that point. The streamline at a stagnation point is perpendicular to the surface of the body.

== See also ==
- Stagnation point flow
