= Velocity potential =

Scalar potential used in fluid dynamics

Within the applied mathematical study of fluid dynamics and continuum mechanics, a velocity potential is a scalar potential used in potential flow theory. It was introduced by Joseph-Louis Lagrange in 1788.

Suppose a smooth vector field $\mathbf{u}$ in a simple connected region represents the flow velocity of a fluid at each point. This flow field is said to be irrotational when
$$\nabla \times \mathbf{u} =0 \,.$$
If the flow field is irrotational, then it can be also be represented as the gradient of a scalar function $\phi$:
$$\mathbf{u} = \nabla \phi\ =
\frac{\partial \phi}{\partial x} \mathbf{i} +
\frac{\partial \phi}{\partial y} \mathbf{j} +
\frac{\partial \phi}{\partial z} \mathbf{k} \,.$$

$\phi$ is known as a velocity potential for u. Velocity potentials are unique up to a constant and a function solely of the temporal variable. So if $\phi(x,y,z)$ is a velocity potential, then $\phi(x,y,z)+f(t) + C$ generates the same flow field as $\phi(x,y,z)$.

The Laplacian of a velocity potential is equal to the divergence of the corresponding flow. Hence if a velocity potential satisfies Laplace equation, the flow is incompressible.

Unlike a stream function, a velocity potential can exist in three-dimensional flow.

== Usage in acoustics ==
In theoretical acoustics, it is often desirable to work with the acoustic wave equation of the velocity potential $\phi$ instead of pressure p and/or particle velocity u.
$$\nabla ^2 \phi - \frac{1}{c^2} \frac{ \partial^2 \phi }{ \partial t ^2 } = 0$$
Solving the wave equation for either p field or u field does not necessarily provide a simple answer for the other field. On the other hand, when $\phi$ is solved for, not only is u found as given above, but p is also easily found—from the (linearised) Bernoulli equation for irrotational and unsteady flow—as
$$p = -\rho \frac{\partial\phi}{\partial t} \,.$$

== See also ==
- Vorticity
- Hamiltonian fluid mechanics
- Potential flow
- Potential flow around a circular cylinder
