= Potential flow =

Velocity field as the gradient of a scalar function

Potential-flow streamlines around a NACA 0012 airfoil at 11° angle of attack, with upper and lower streamtubes identified. The flow is two-dimensional and the airfoil has infinite span.

In fluid dynamics, potential flow or irrotational flow refers to the idealised, frictionless flow of a fluid. Flows of two kinds are visualised in this way:

1. The flow of an inviscid fluid
2. The flow of a fluid of low viscosity, in regions that do not contain a boundary layer. See Prandtl hypothesis.

Potential flow describes the velocity field as the gradient of a scalar function: the velocity potential. As a result, a potential flow is characterized by an irrotational velocity field, which is a valid approximation for several applications. The irrotationality of a potential flow is due to the curl of the gradient of a scalar always being equal to zero.

In the case of an incompressible flow the velocity potential satisfies Laplace's equation, and potential theory is applicable. However, potential flows also have been used to describe compressible flows and Hele-Shaw flows. The potential flow approach occurs in the modeling of both stationary as well as nonstationary flows. Applications of potential flow include: the outer flow field for aerofoils, water waves, electroosmotic flow, and groundwater flow.

A region containing friction forces (described as shear forces and viscous forces) can be described as a region containing vorticity. For flows (or parts thereof) with strong vorticity effects, the potential flow approximation is not applicable. In flow regions where vorticity is known to be important, such as wakes and boundary layers, potential flow theory is not able to provide reasonable predictions of the flow. However, there are often large regions of a flow in which the assumption of irrotationality is valid, allowing the use of potential flow for various applications; these include flow around aircraft, groundwater flow, acoustics, water waves, and electroosmotic flow.

== Description and characteristics ==
A potential flow is constructed by adding simple elementary flows and observing the result.

Streamlines for the incompressible potential flow around a circular cylinder in a uniform onflow.

In potential or irrotational flow, the vorticity vector field is zero, i.e.,

$$\boldsymbol\omega \equiv \nabla\times\mathbf v=0,$$

where $\mathbf v(\mathbf x,t)$ is the velocity field and $\boldsymbol\omega(\mathbf x,t)$ is the vorticity field. Like any vector field having zero curl, the velocity field can be expressed as the gradient of certain scalar, say $\varphi(\mathbf x,t)$ which is called the velocity potential, since the curl of the gradient is always zero. We therefore have

$$\mathbf{v} = \nabla \varphi.$$

The velocity potential is not uniquely defined since one can add to it an arbitrary function of time, say $f(t)$, without affecting the relevant physical quantity which is $\mathbf v$. The non-uniqueness is usually removed by suitably selecting appropriate initial or boundary conditions satisfied by $\varphi$ and as such the procedure may vary from one problem to another.

In potential flow, the circulation $\Gamma$ around any simply-connected contour $C$ is zero. This can be shown using the Stokes theorem,

$$\Gamma \equiv \oint_C \mathbf v\cdot d\mathbf l = \int \boldsymbol\omega\cdot d\mathbf f=0$$

where $d\mathbf l$ is the line element on the contour and $d\mathbf f$ is the area element of any surface bounded by the contour. In multiply-connected space (say, around a contour enclosing solid body in two dimensions or around a contour enclosing a torus in three-dimensions) or in the presence of concentrated vortices, (say, in the so-called irrotational vortices or point vortices, or in smoke rings), the circulation $\Gamma$ need not be zero. In the former case, Stokes theorem cannot be applied and in the later case, $\boldsymbol\omega$ is non-zero within the region bounded by the contour. Around a contour encircling an infinitely long solid cylinder with which the contour loops $N$ times, we have

$$\Gamma = N \kappa$$

where $\kappa$ is a cyclic constant. This example belongs to a doubly-connected space. In an $n$-tuply connected space, there are $n-1$ such cyclic constants, namely, $\kappa_1,\kappa_2,\dots,\kappa_{n-1}.$

== Incompressible flow ==
In case of an incompressible flow — for instance of a liquid, or a gas at low Mach numbers; but not for sound waves — the velocity v has zero divergence:

$$\nabla \cdot \mathbf{v} =0 \,,$$

Substituting here $\mathbf v = \nabla\varphi$ shows that $\varphi$ satisfies the Laplace equation

$$\nabla^2 \varphi = 0 \,,$$

where ∇^{2} = ∇ ⋅ ∇ is the Laplace operator (sometimes also written Δ). Since solutions of the Laplace equation are harmonic functions, every harmonic function represents a potential flow solution. As evident, in the incompressible case, the velocity field is determined completely from its kinematics: the assumptions of irrotationality and zero divergence of flow. Dynamics in connection with the momentum equations, only have to be applied afterwards, if one is interested in computing pressure field: for instance for flow around airfoils through the use of Bernoulli's principle.

In incompressible flows, contrary to common misconception, the potential flow indeed satisfies the full Navier–Stokes equations, not just the Euler equations, because the viscous term

$$\mu\nabla^2\mathbf v = \mu\nabla(\nabla\cdot\mathbf v)-\mu\nabla\times\boldsymbol\omega=0$$

is identically zero. It is the inability of the potential flow to satisfy the required boundary conditions, especially near solid boundaries, makes it invalid in representing the required flow field. If the potential flow satisfies the necessary conditions, then it is the required solution of the incompressible Navier–Stokes equations.

In two dimensions, with the help of the harmonic function $\varphi$ and its conjugate harmonic function $\psi$ (stream function), incompressible potential flow reduces to a very simple system that is analyzed using complex analysis (see below).

== Compressible flow ==
=== Steady flow ===
Potential flow theory can also be used to model irrotational compressible flow. The derivation of the governing equation for $\varphi$ from Eulers equation is quite straightforward. The continuity and the (potential flow) momentum equations for steady flows are given by

$$\rho \nabla\cdot\mathbf v + \mathbf v\cdot\nabla \rho = 0, \quad (\mathbf v \cdot\nabla)\mathbf v= -\frac{1}{\rho}\nabla p = -\frac{c^2}{\rho}\nabla \rho$$

where the last equation follows from the fact that entropy is constant for a fluid particle and that square of the sound speed is $c^2=(\partial p/\partial\rho)_s$. Eliminating $\nabla\rho$ from the two governing equations results in

$$c^2\nabla\cdot\mathbf v - \mathbf v\cdot (\mathbf v \cdot \nabla)\mathbf v=0.$$

The incompressible version emerges in the limit $c\to\infty$. Substituting here $\mathbf v=\nabla\varphi$ results in

$$(c^2-\varphi_x^2)\varphi_{xx}+(c^2-\varphi_y^2)\varphi_{yy}+(c^2-\varphi_z^2)\varphi_{zz}-2(\varphi_x\varphi_y\varphi_{xy}+\varphi_y\varphi_z\varphi_{yz}+\varphi_z\varphi_x\phi_{zx})=0$$

where $c=c(v)$ is expressed as a function of the velocity magnitude $v^2=(\nabla\phi)^2$. For a polytropic gas, $c^2 = (\gamma-1)(h_0-v^2/2)$, where $\gamma$ is the specific heat ratio and $h_0$ is the stagnation enthalpy. In two dimensions, the equation simplifies to

$$(c^2-\varphi_x^2)\varphi_{xx}+(c^2-\varphi_y^2)\varphi_{yy}-2\varphi_x\varphi_y\varphi_{xy}=0.$$

Validity: As it stands, the equation is valid for any inviscid potential flows, irrespective of whether the flow is subsonic or supersonic (e.g. Prandtl–Meyer flow). However in supersonic and also in transonic flows, shock waves can occur which can introduce entropy and vorticity into the flow making the flow rotational. Nevertheless, there are two cases for which potential flow prevails even in the presence of shock waves, which are explained from the (not necessarily potential) momentum equation written in the following form

$$\nabla (h+v^2/2) - \mathbf v\times\boldsymbol\omega = T \nabla s$$

where $h$ is the specific enthalpy, $\boldsymbol\omega$ is the vorticity field, $T$ is the temperature and $s$ is the specific entropy. Since in front of the leading shock wave, we have a potential flow, Bernoulli's equation shows that $h+v^2/2$ is constant, which is also constant across the shock wave (Rankine–Hugoniot conditions) and therefore we can write

$$\mathbf v\times\boldsymbol\omega = -T \nabla s$$

1) When the shock wave is of constant intensity, the entropy discontinuity across the shock wave is also constant i.e., $\nabla s=0$ and therefore vorticity production is zero. Shock waves at the pointed leading edge of two-dimensional wedge or three-dimensional cone (Taylor–Maccoll flow) has constant intensity. 2) For weak shock waves, the entropy jump across the shock wave is a third-order quantity in terms of shock wave strength and therefore $\nabla s$ can be neglected. Shock waves in slender bodies lies nearly parallel to the body and they are weak.

Nearly parallel flows: When the flow is predominantly unidirectional with small deviations such as in flow past slender bodies, the full equation can be further simplified. Let $U\mathbf{e}_x$ be the mainstream and consider small deviations from this velocity field. The corresponding velocity potential can be written as $\varphi = x U + \phi$ where $\phi$ characterizes the small departure from the uniform flow and satisfies the linearized version of the full equation. This is given by

$$(1-M^2) \frac{\partial^2\phi}{\partial x^2} + \frac{\partial^2\phi}{\partial y^2} + \frac{\partial^2\phi}{\partial z^2} =0$$

where $M=U/c_\infty$ is the constant Mach number corresponding to the uniform flow. This equation is valid provided $M$ is not close to unity. When $|M-1|$ is small (transonic flow), we have the following nonlinear equation

$$2\alpha_*\frac{\partial\phi}{\partial x} \frac{\partial^2\phi}{\partial x^2} = \frac{\partial^2\phi}{\partial y^2} + \frac{\partial^2\phi}{\partial z^2}$$

where $\alpha_*$ is the critical value of Landau derivative $\alpha = (c^4/2\upsilon^3)(\partial^2 \upsilon/\partial p^2)_s$ and $\upsilon=1/\rho$ is the specific volume. The transonic flow is completely characterized by the single parameter $\alpha_*$, which for polytropic gas takes the value $\alpha_*=\alpha=(\gamma+1)/2$. Under hodograph transformation, the transonic equation in two-dimensions becomes the Euler–Tricomi equation.

=== Unsteady flow ===
The continuity and the (potential flow) momentum equations for unsteady flows are given by

$$\frac{\partial\rho}{\partial t} + \rho \nabla\cdot\mathbf v + \mathbf v\cdot\nabla \rho = 0, \quad \frac{\partial\mathbf v}{\partial t}+ (\mathbf v \cdot\nabla)\mathbf v= -\frac{1}{\rho}\nabla p =-\frac{c^2}{\rho}\nabla \rho=-\nabla h.$$

The first integral of the (potential flow) momentum equation is given by

$$\frac{\partial\varphi}{\partial t} + \frac{v^2}{2} + h = f(t), \quad \Rightarrow \quad \frac{\partial h}{\partial t} = -\frac{\partial^2\varphi}{\partial t^2} - \frac{1}{2}\frac{\partial v^2}{\partial t} + \frac{df}{dt}$$

where $f(t)$ is an arbitrary function. Without loss of generality, we can set $f(t)=0$ since $\varphi$ is not uniquely defined. Combining these equations, we obtain

$$\frac{\partial^2\varphi}{\partial t^2} + \frac{\partial v^2}{\partial t}=c^2\nabla\cdot\mathbf v - \mathbf v\cdot (\mathbf v \cdot \nabla)\mathbf v.$$

Substituting here $\mathbf v=\nabla\varphi$ results in

$$\varphi_{tt} + (\varphi_x^2+ \varphi_y^2+ \varphi_z^2)_t= (c^2-\varphi_x^2)\varphi_{xx}+(c^2-\varphi_y^2)\varphi_{yy}+(c^2-\varphi_z^2)\varphi_{zz}-2(\varphi_x\varphi_y\varphi_{xy}+\varphi_y\varphi_z\varphi_{yz}+\varphi_z\varphi_x\phi_{zx}).$$

Nearly parallel flows: As in before, for nearly parallel flows, we can write (after introducing a recaled time $\tau=c_\infty t$)

$$\frac{\partial^2\phi}{\partial \tau^2}  +  2M \frac{\partial^2\phi}{\partial x\partial\tau}= (1-M^2) \frac{\partial^2\phi}{\partial x^2} + \frac{\partial^2\phi}{\partial y^2} + \frac{\partial^2\phi}{\partial z^2}$$

provided the constant Mach number $M$ is not close to unity. When $|M-1|$ is small (transonic flow), we have the following nonlinear equation

$$\frac{\partial^2\phi}{\partial \tau^2}  +  2\frac{\partial^2\phi}{\partial x\partial\tau} = -2\alpha_*\frac{\partial\phi}{\partial x} \frac{\partial^2\phi}{\partial x^2} + \frac{\partial^2\phi}{\partial y^2} + \frac{\partial^2\phi}{\partial z^2}.$$

Sound waves: In sound waves, the velocity magnitude $v$ (or the Mach number) is very small, although the unsteady term is now comparable to the other leading terms in the equation. Thus neglecting all quadratic and higher-order terms and noting that in the same approximation, $c$ is a constant (for example, in polytropic gas $c^2=(\gamma-1)h_0$), we have

$$\frac{\partial^2 \varphi}{\partial t^2} = c^2 \nabla^2 \varphi,$$

which is a linear wave equation for the velocity potential φ. Again the oscillatory part of the velocity vector v is related to the velocity potential by v = ∇φ, while as before Δ is the Laplace operator, and c is the average speed of sound in the homogeneous medium. Note that also the oscillatory parts of the pressure p and density ρ each individually satisfy the wave equation, in this approximation.

== Applicability and limitations ==
Potential flow does not include all the characteristics of flows that are encountered in the real world. Potential flow theory cannot be applied for viscous internal flows, except for flows between closely spaced plates. Richard Feynman considered potential flow to be so unphysical that the only fluid to obey the assumptions was "dry water" (quoting John von Neumann). Incompressible potential flow also makes a number of invalid predictions, such as d'Alembert's paradox, which states that the drag on any object moving through an infinite fluid otherwise at rest is zero. More precisely, potential flow cannot account for the behaviour of flows that include a boundary layer. Nevertheless, understanding potential flow is important in many branches of fluid mechanics. In particular, simple potential flows (called elementary flows) such as the free vortex and the point source possess ready analytical solutions. These solutions can be superposed to create more complex flows satisfying a variety of boundary conditions. These flows correspond closely to real-life flows over the whole of fluid mechanics; in addition, many valuable insights arise when considering the deviation (often slight) between an observed flow and the corresponding potential flow. Potential flow finds many applications in fields such as aircraft design. For instance, in computational fluid dynamics, one technique is to couple a potential flow solution outside the boundary layer to a solution of the boundary layer equations inside the boundary layer. The absence of boundary layer effects means that any streamline can be replaced by a solid boundary with no change in the flow field, a technique used in many aerodynamic design approaches. Another technique would be the use of Riabouchinsky solids.

== Analysis for two-dimensional incompressible flow ==
Potential flow in two dimensions is simple to analyze using conformal mapping, by the use of transformations of the complex plane. However, use of complex numbers is not required, as for example in the classical analysis of fluid flow past a cylinder. It is not possible to solve a potential flow using complex numbers in three dimensions.

The basic idea is to use a holomorphic (also called analytic) or meromorphic function f, which maps the physical domain (x, y) to the transformed domain (φ, ψ). While x, y, φ and ψ are all real valued, it is convenient to define the complex quantities

$$\begin{align}
z &= x + iy \,, \text{ and } &
w &= \varphi + i\psi \,.
\end{align}$$

Now, if we write the mapping f as

$$\begin{align}
f(x + iy) &= \varphi + i\psi \,, \text{ or } &
f(z) &= w \,.
\end{align}$$

Then, because f is a holomorphic or meromorphic function, it has to satisfy the Cauchy–Riemann equations

$$\begin{align}
\frac{\partial\varphi}{\partial x} &=  \frac{\partial\psi}{\partial y} \,, &
\frac{\partial\varphi}{\partial y} &= -\frac{\partial\psi}{\partial x} \,.
\end{align}$$

The velocity components (u, v), in the (x, y) directions respectively, can be obtained directly from f by differentiating with respect to z. That is

$$\frac{df}{dz} = u - iv$$

So the velocity field v = (u, v) is specified by

$$\begin{align}
u &= \frac{\partial\varphi}{\partial x} = \frac{\partial\psi}{\partial y}, &
v &= \frac{\partial\varphi}{\partial y} = -\frac{\partial\psi}{\partial x} \,.
\end{align}$$

Both φ and ψ then satisfy Laplace's equation:

$$\begin{align}
\Delta\varphi &= \frac{\partial^2\varphi}{\partial x^2} + \frac{\partial^2\varphi}{\partial y^2} = 0 \,,\text{ and } &
\Delta\psi &= \frac{\partial^2\psi}{\partial x^2} + \frac{\partial^2\psi}{\partial y^2} = 0 \,.
\end{align}$$

So φ can be identified as the velocity potential and ψ is called the stream function. Lines of constant ψ are known as streamlines and lines of constant φ are known as equipotential lines (see equipotential surface).

Streamlines and equipotential lines are orthogonal to each other, since

$$\nabla \varphi \cdot \nabla \psi =
\frac{\partial\varphi}{\partial x} \frac{\partial\psi}{\partial x} + \frac{\partial\varphi}{\partial y} \frac{\partial\psi}{\partial y} =
\frac{\partial \psi}{\partial y} \frac{\partial \psi}{\partial x} - \frac{\partial \psi}{\partial x} \frac{\partial \psi}{\partial y} =
0 \,.$$

Thus the flow occurs along the lines of constant ψ and at right angles to the lines of constant φ.

Δψ = 0 is also satisfied, this relation being equivalent to ∇ × v = 0. So the flow is irrotational. The automatic condition ∂^{2}ψ/(∂x ∂y) = ∂^{2}ψ/(∂y ∂x) then gives the incompressibility constraint ∇ · v = 0.

== Examples of two-dimensional incompressible flows ==
Any differentiable function may be used for f. The examples that follow use a variety of elementary functions; special functions may also be used. Note that multi-valued functions such as the natural logarithm may be used, but attention must be confined to a single Riemann surface.

=== Power laws ===
Examples of conformal maps for the power law w = Az^{n}
Examples of conformal maps for the power law w = Az^{n}, for different values of the power n. Shown is the z-plane, showing lines of constant potential φ and streamfunction ψ, while w = φ + iψ.

In case the following power-law conformal map is applied, from z = x + iy to w = φ + iψ:

$$w=Az^n \,,$$

then, writing z in polar coordinates as z = x + iy = re^{iθ}, we have

$$\varphi=Ar^n\cos n\theta \qquad \text{and} \qquad \psi=Ar^n\sin n\theta \,.$$

In the figures to the right examples are given for several values of n. The black line is the boundary of the flow, while the darker blue lines are streamlines, and the lighter blue lines are equi-potential lines. Some interesting powers n are:

- n = 1/2: this corresponds with flow around a semi-infinite plate,
- n = 2/3: flow around a right corner,
- n = 1: a trivial case of uniform flow,
- n = 2: flow through a corner, or near a stagnation point, and
- n = −1: flow due to a source doublet

The constant A is a scaling parameter: its absolute value |A| determines the scale, while its argument arg(A) introduces a rotation (if non-zero).

==== Power laws with n = 1: uniform flow ====
If w = Az^{1}, that is, a power law with n = 1, the streamlines (i.e. lines of constant ψ) are a system of straight lines parallel to the x-axis. This is easiest to see by writing in terms of real and imaginary components:

$$f(x+iy) = A\, (x+iy) = Ax + i Ay$$

thus giving φ = Ax and ψ = Ay. This flow may be interpreted as uniform flow parallel to the x-axis.

==== Power laws with n = 2 ====
If n = 2, then w = Az^{2} and the streamline corresponding to a particular value of ψ are those points satisfying

$$\psi=Ar^2\sin 2\theta \,,$$

which is a system of rectangular hyperbolae. This may be seen by again rewriting in terms of real and imaginary components. Noting that sin 2θ = 2 sin θ cos θ and rewriting sin θ = y/r and cos θ = x/r it is seen (on simplifying) that the streamlines are given by

$$\psi=2Axy \,.$$

The velocity field is given by ∇φ, or

$$\begin{pmatrix} u \\ v \end{pmatrix} =  \begin{pmatrix} \frac{\partial \varphi}{\partial x} \\[2px] \frac{\partial \varphi}{\partial y}
\end{pmatrix} =  \begin{pmatrix} + {\partial \psi \over \partial y} \\[2px] - {\partial \psi \over \partial x} \end{pmatrix} = \begin{pmatrix} +2Ax \\[2px] -2Ay \end{pmatrix} \,.$$

In fluid dynamics, the flowfield near the origin corresponds to a stagnation point. Note that the fluid at the origin is at rest (this follows on differentiation of f(z) = z^{2} at z = 0). The ψ = 0 streamline is particularly interesting: it has two (or four) branches, following the coordinate axes, i.e. x = 0 and y = 0. As no fluid flows across the x-axis, it (the x-axis) may be treated as a solid boundary. It is thus possible to ignore the flow in the lower half-plane where y < 0 and to focus on the flow in the upper halfplane. With this interpretation, the flow is that of a vertically directed jet impinging on a horizontal flat plate. The flow may also be interpreted as flow into a 90 degree corner if the regions specified by (say) x, y < 0 are ignored.

==== Power laws with n = 3 ====
If n = 3, the resulting flow is a sort of hexagonal version of the n = 2 case considered above. Streamlines are given by, ψ = 3x^{2}y − y^{3} and the flow in this case may be interpreted as flow into a 60° corner.

==== Power laws with n = −1: doublet ====
If n = −1, the streamlines are given by

$$\psi = -\frac{A}{r}\sin\theta.$$

This is more easily interpreted in terms of real and imaginary components:
$$\begin{align}
\psi = \frac{-A y}{r^2} &= \frac{-A y}{x^2 + y^2} \,, \\
x^2 + y^2 + \frac{A y}{\psi} &= 0 \,, \\
x^2 + \left(y+\frac{A}{2\psi}\right)^2 &= \left(\frac{A}{2\psi}\right)^2 \,.
\end{align}$$

Thus the streamlines are circles that are tangent to the x-axis at the origin. The circles in the upper half-plane thus flow clockwise, those in the lower half-plane flow anticlockwise. Note that the velocity components are proportional to r^{−2}; and their values at the origin is infinite. This flow pattern is usually referred to as a doublet, or dipole, and can be interpreted as the combination of a source-sink pair of infinite strength kept an infinitesimally small distance apart. The velocity field is given by

$$(u,v)=\left( \frac{\partial \psi}{\partial y}, - \frac{\partial \psi}{\partial x} \right) =  \left(A\frac{y^2-x^2}{\left(x^2+y^2\right)^2},-A\frac{2xy}{\left(x^2+y^2\right)^2}\right) \,.$$

or in polar coordinates:

$$(u_r, u_\theta)=\left( \frac{1}{r} \frac{\partial \psi}{\partial \theta}, - \frac{\partial \psi}{\partial r} \right) = \left(-\frac{A}{r^2}\cos\theta, -\frac{A}{r^2}\sin\theta\right) \,.$$

==== Power laws with n = −2: quadrupole ====
If n = −2, the streamlines are given by

$$\psi=-\frac{A}{r^2}\sin 2 \theta \,.$$

This is the flow field associated with a quadrupole.

=== Line source and sink ===
A line source or sink of strength $Q$ ($Q>0$ for source and $Q<0$ for sink) is given by the potential

$$w = \frac{Q}{2\pi} \ln z$$

where $Q$ in fact is the volume flux per unit length across a surface enclosing the source or sink. The velocity field in polar coordinates are

$$u_r = \frac{Q}{2\pi r},\quad u_\theta=0$$

i.e., a purely radial flow.

=== Line vortex ===
A line vortex of strength $\Gamma$ is given by

$$w=\frac{\Gamma}{2\pi i}\ln z$$

where $\Gamma$ is the circulation around any simple closed contour enclosing the vortex. The velocity field in polar coordinates are

$$u_r = 0,\quad u_\theta=\frac{\Gamma}{2\pi r}$$

i.e., a purely azimuthal flow.

== Analysis for three-dimensional incompressible flows ==
For three-dimensional flows, complex potential cannot be obtained.

=== Point source and sink ===
The velocity potential of a point source or sink of strength $Q$ ($Q>0$ for source and $Q<0$ for sink) in spherical polar coordinates is given by

$$\phi = -\frac{Q}{4\pi r}$$

where $Q$ in fact is the volume flux across a closed surface enclosing the source or sink. The velocity field in spherical polar coordinates are

$$u_r = \frac{Q}{4\pi r^2}, \quad u_\theta=0, \quad u_\phi = 0.$$

== See also ==
- Potential flow around a circular cylinder
- Aerodynamic potential-flow code
- Conformal mapping
- Darwin drift
- Flownet
- Laplacian field
- Laplace equation for irrotational flow
- Potential theory
- Stream function
- Velocity potential
- Helmholtz decomposition
