= Flow velocity =

Vector field which is used to mathematically describe the motion of a continuum

In continuum mechanics the flow velocity in fluid dynamics, also macroscopic velocity in statistical mechanics, or drift velocity in electromagnetism, is a vector field used to mathematically describe the motion of a continuum. The length of the flow velocity vector is scalar, the flow speed. It is also called velocity field; when evaluated along a line, it is called a velocity profile (as in, e.g., law of the wall).

== Definition ==
The flow velocity u of a fluid is a vector field

$$\mathbf{u}=\mathbf{u}(\mathbf{x},t),$$

which gives the velocity of an element of fluid at a position $\mathbf{x}\,$ and time $t.\,$

The flow speed q is the length of the flow velocity vector

$$q = \| \mathbf{u} \|$$

and is a scalar field.

== Uses ==
The flow velocity of a fluid effectively describes everything about the motion of a fluid. Many physical properties of a fluid can be expressed mathematically in terms of the flow velocity. Some common examples follow:

=== Steady flow ===
The flow of a fluid is said to be steady if $\mathbf{u}$ does not vary with time. That is if

$$\frac{\partial \mathbf{u}}{\partial t}=0.$$

=== Incompressible flow ===
If a fluid is incompressible the divergence of $\mathbf{u}$ is zero:

$$\nabla\cdot\mathbf{u}=0.$$

That is, if $\mathbf{u}$ is a solenoidal vector field.

=== Irrotational flow ===
A flow is irrotational if the curl of $\mathbf{u}$ is zero:

$$\nabla\times\mathbf{u}=0.$$

That is, if $\mathbf{u}$ is an irrotational vector field.

A flow in a simply-connected domain which is irrotational can be described as a potential flow, through the use of a velocity potential $\Phi,$ with $\mathbf{u}=\nabla\Phi.$ If the flow is both irrotational and incompressible, the Laplacian of the velocity potential must be zero: $\Delta\Phi=0.$

=== Vorticity ===
The vorticity, $\omega$, of a flow can be defined in terms of its flow velocity by

$$\omega=\nabla\times\mathbf{u}.$$

If the vorticity is zero, the flow is irrotational.

== The velocity potential ==
If an irrotational flow occupies a simply-connected fluid region then there exists a scalar field $\phi$ such that

$$\mathbf{u}=\nabla\mathbf{\phi}.$$

The scalar field $\phi$ is called the velocity potential for the flow. (See Irrotational vector field.)

== Bulk velocity ==
In many engineering applications the local flow velocity $\mathbf{u}$ vector field is not known in every point and the only accessible velocity is the bulk velocity or average flow velocity $\bar{u}$ (with the usual dimension of length per time), defined as the quotient between the volume flow rate $\dot{V}$ (with dimension of cubed length per time) and the cross sectional area $A$ (with dimension of square length):

$$\bar{u}=\frac{\dot{V}}{A}$$.

== See also ==
- Displacement field (mechanics)
- Drift velocity
- Enstrophy
- Group velocity
- Particle velocity
- Pitot tube
- Pressure gradient
- Strain rate
- Strain-rate tensor
- Stream function
- Velocity potential
- Vorticity
- Wind velocity
