= Incompressible flow =

Fluid flow in which density remains constant

In fluid mechanics, or more generally continuum mechanics, incompressible flow is a flow in which the material density does not vary over time. Equivalently, the divergence of an incompressible flow velocity is zero. Under certain conditions, the flow of compressible fluids can be modelled as incompressible flow to a good approximation.

== Derivation ==
The fundamental requirement for incompressible flow is that the density, $\rho$, is constant within a small element volume, dV, which moves at the flow velocity u. Mathematically, this constraint implies that the material derivative (discussed below) of the density must vanish to ensure incompressible flow. Before introducing this constraint, we must apply the conservation of mass to generate the necessary relations. The mass is calculated by a volume integral of the density, $\rho$:

$${m} = {\iiint\limits_V\! \rho \,\mathrm{d}V}.$$

The conservation of mass requires that the time derivative of the mass inside a control volume be equal to the mass flux, J, across its boundaries. Mathematically, we can represent this constraint in terms of a surface integral:

$${\partial m \over \partial t} = - \oint_{S}\mathbf{J} \cdot d\mathbf{S}$$

The negative sign in the above expression ensures that outward flow results in a decrease in the mass with respect to time, using the convention that the surface area vector points outward. Now, using the divergence theorem we can derive the relationship between the flux and the partial time derivative of the density:

$${\iiint\limits_V {\partial \rho \over \partial t} \,\mathrm{d}V} =  {- \iiint\limits_V\left(\nabla\cdot\mathbf{J}\right) \, \mathrm{d}V},$$

therefore:

$${\partial \rho \over \partial t} = - \nabla \cdot \mathbf{J}.$$

The partial derivative of the density with respect to time need not vanish to ensure incompressible flow. When we speak of the partial derivative of the density with respect to time, we refer to this rate of change within a control volume of fixed position. By letting the partial time derivative of the density be non-zero, we are not restricting ourselves to incompressible fluids, because the density can change as observed from a fixed position as fluid flows through the control volume. This approach maintains generality, and not requiring that the partial time derivative of the density vanish illustrates that incompressible fluids can still undergo compressible flow. What interests us is the change in density of a control volume that moves along with the flow velocity, u. The flux is related to the flow velocity through the following function:

$${\mathbf{J}} = {\rho \mathbf{u}}.$$

So that the conservation of mass implies that:

$${\partial \rho \over \partial t} + {\nabla \cdot \left(\rho \mathbf{u} \right)} = {\partial \rho \over \partial t} + {\nabla \rho \cdot \mathbf{u}} + {\rho \left(\nabla \cdot \mathbf{u} \right)} = 0.$$

The previous relation (where we have used the appropriate product rule) is known as the continuity equation. Now, we need the following relation about the total derivative of the density (where we apply the chain rule):

$${\mathrm{d}\rho \over \mathrm{d}t} = {\partial \rho \over \partial t} + {\partial \rho \over \partial x} {\mathrm{d}x \over \mathrm{d}t} + {\partial \rho \over \partial y} {\mathrm{d}y \over \mathrm{d}t} + {\partial \rho \over \partial z} {\mathrm{d}z \over \mathrm{d}t}.$$

So if we choose a control volume that is moving at the same rate as the fluid (i.e. (dx/dt, dy/dt, dz/dt) = u), then this expression simplifies to the material derivative:

$${D \rho \over Dt} = {\partial \rho \over \partial t} + {\nabla \rho \cdot \mathbf{u}}.$$

And so using the continuity equation derived above, we see that:

$${D \rho \over Dt} = {- \rho \left(\nabla \cdot \mathbf{u} \right)}.$$

A change in the density over time would imply that the fluid had either compressed or expanded (or that the mass contained in our constant volume, dV, had changed), which we have prohibited. We must then require that the material derivative of the density vanishes, and equivalently (for non-zero density) so must the divergence of the flow velocity:

$${\nabla \cdot \mathbf{u}} = 0.$$

And so beginning with the conservation of mass and the constraint that the density within a moving volume of fluid remains constant, it has been shown that an equivalent condition required for incompressible flow is that the divergence of the flow velocity vanishes.

== Relation to compressibility ==
In some fields, a measure of the incompressibility of a flow is the change in density as a result of the pressure variations. This is best expressed in terms of the compressibility

$$\beta = {\frac{1}{\rho}} {\frac{\mathrm{d}\rho}{\mathrm{d}p}}.$$

If the compressibility is acceptably small, the flow is considered incompressible.

== Relation to solenoidal field ==
An incompressible flow is described by a solenoidal flow velocity field. But a solenoidal field, besides having a zero divergence, also has the additional connotation of having non-zero curl (i.e., rotational component).

Otherwise, if an incompressible flow also has a curl of zero, so that it is also irrotational, then the flow velocity field is actually Laplacian.

== Difference from material ==
As defined earlier, an incompressible (isochoric) flow is the one in which

$$\nabla \cdot \mathbf u = 0. \,$$

This is equivalent to saying that

$$\frac{D\rho}{Dt} = \frac{\partial \rho}{\partial t} + \mathbf u \cdot \nabla \rho = 0$$

i.e. the material derivative of the density is zero. Thus if one follows a material element, its mass density remains constant. Note that the material derivative consists of two terms. The first term $\tfrac{\partial \rho}{\partial t}$ describes how the density of the material element changes with time. This term is also known as the unsteady term. The second term, $\mathbf u \cdot \nabla \rho$ describes the changes in the density as the material element moves from one point to another. This is the advection term (convection term for scalar field). For a flow to be accounted as bearing incompressibility, the accretion sum of these terms should vanish.

On the other hand, a homogeneous, incompressible material is one that has constant density throughout. For such a material, $\rho = \text{constant}$. This implies that,

$\frac{\partial \rho}{\partial t} = 0$ and
$\nabla \rho = 0$ independently.

From the continuity equation it follows that

$$\frac{D\rho}{Dt} = \frac{\partial \rho}{\partial t} + \mathbf u \cdot \nabla \rho = 0 \ \Rightarrow\  \nabla \cdot \mathbf u = 0$$

Thus homogeneous materials always undergo flow that is incompressible, but the converse is not true. That is, compressible materials might not experience compression in the flow.

== Related flow constraints ==
In fluid dynamics, a flow is considered incompressible if the divergence of the flow velocity is zero. However, related formulations can sometimes be used, depending on the flow system being modelled. Some versions are described below:

1. Incompressible flow: ${\nabla \cdot \mathbf u = 0}$. This can assume either constant density (strict incompressible) or varying density flow. The varying density set accepts solutions involving small perturbations in density, pressure and/or temperature fields, and can allow for pressure stratification in the domain.
2. Anelastic flow: ${\nabla \cdot \left(\rho_{o}\mathbf u\right) = 0}$. Principally used in the field of atmospheric sciences, the anelastic constraint extends incompressible flow validity to stratified density and/or temperature as well as pressure. This allows the thermodynamic variables to relax to an 'atmospheric' base state seen in the lower atmosphere when used in the field of meteorology, for example. This condition can also be used for various astrophysical systems.
3. Low Mach-number flow, or pseudo-incompressibility: $\nabla \cdot \left(\alpha \mathbf u \right) = \beta$. The low Mach-number constraint can be derived from the compressible Euler equations using scale analysis of non-dimensional quantities. The restraint, like the previous in this section, allows for the removal of acoustic waves, but also allows for large perturbations in density and/or temperature. The assumption is that the flow remains within a Mach number limit (normally less than 0.3) for any solution using such a constraint to be valid. Again, in accordance with all incompressible flows the pressure deviation must be small in comparison to the pressure base state.

These methods make differing assumptions about the flow, but all take into account the general form of the constraint $\nabla \cdot \left(\alpha \mathbf u \right) = \beta$ for general flow dependent functions $\alpha$ and $\beta$.

== Numerical approximations ==
The stringent nature of incompressible flow equations means that specific mathematical techniques have been devised to solve them. Some of these methods include:

1. The projection method (both approximate and exact)
2. Artificial compressibility technique (approximate)
3. Compressibility pre-conditioning

== See also ==
- Bernoulli's principle
- Euler equations (fluid dynamics)
- Isochoric flow
- Navier–Stokes equations
