= Stokes flow =

Type of fluid flow

An object moving through a gas or liquid experiences a force in direction opposite to its motion. Terminal velocity is achieved when the drag force is equal in magnitude but opposite in direction to the force propelling the object. Shown is a sphere in Stokes flow, at very low Reynolds number.

Stokes flow (named after George Gabriel Stokes), also named creeping flow or creeping motion, is a type of fluid flow where advective inertial forces are small compared with viscous forces. The Reynolds number is low, i.e. $\mathrm{Re} \ll 1$. This is a typical situation in flows where the fluid velocities are very slow, the viscosities are very large, or the length-scales of the flow are very small. Creeping flow was first studied to understand lubrication. In nature, this type of flow occurs in the swimming of microorganisms and sperm. In technology, it occurs in paint, MEMS devices, and in the flow of viscous polymers generally.

The equations of motion for Stokes flow, called the Stokes equations, are a linearization of the Navier–Stokes equations, and thus can be solved by a number of well-known methods for linear differential equations. The primary Green's function of Stokes flow is the Stokeslet, which is associated with a singular point force embedded in a Stokes flow. From its derivatives, other fundamental solutions can be obtained. The Stokeslet was first derived by Carl Wilhelm Oseen in 1927, although it was not named as such until 1953 by G. J. Hancock. The closed-form fundamental solutions for the generalized unsteady Stokes and Oseen flows associated with arbitrary time-dependent translational and rotational motions have been derived for the Newtonian and micropolar fluids.

== Stokes equations ==
The equation of motion for Stokes flow can be obtained by linearizing the steady state Navier–Stokes equations. The inertial forces are assumed to be negligible in comparison to the viscous forces, and eliminating the inertial terms of the momentum balance in the Navier–Stokes equations reduces it to the momentum balance in the Stokes equations:

$$\boldsymbol{\nabla} \cdot \sigma + \mathbf{f} = \boldsymbol{0}$$

where $\sigma$ is the stress (sum of viscous and pressure stresses), and $\mathbf{f}$ an applied body force. The full Stokes equations also include an equation for the conservation of mass, commonly written in the form:

$$\frac{\partial\rho}{\partial t} +  \nabla\cdot(\rho\mathbf{u}) = 0$$

where $\rho$ is the fluid density and $\mathbf{u}$ the fluid velocity. To obtain the equations of motion for incompressible flow, it is assumed that the density, $\rho$, is a constant.

Furthermore, occasionally one might consider the unsteady Stokes equations, in which the term $\rho \frac{\partial\mathbf{u}}{\partial t}$ is added to the left hand side of the momentum balance equation.

=== Properties ===
The Stokes equations represent a considerable simplification of the full Navier–Stokes equations, especially in the incompressible Newtonian case. They are the leading-order simplification of the full Navier–Stokes equations, valid in the distinguished limit $\mathrm{Re} \to 0.$

Instantaneity
A Stokes flow has no dependence on time other than through time-dependent boundary conditions. This means that, given the boundary conditions of a Stokes flow, the flow can be found without knowledge of the flow at any other time.

Time-reversibility
An immediate consequence of instantaneity, time-reversibility means that a time-reversed Stokes flow solves the same equations as the original Stokes flow. This property can sometimes be used (in conjunction with linearity and symmetry in the boundary conditions) to derive results about a flow without solving it fully. Time reversibility means that it is difficult to mix two fluids using creeping flow.

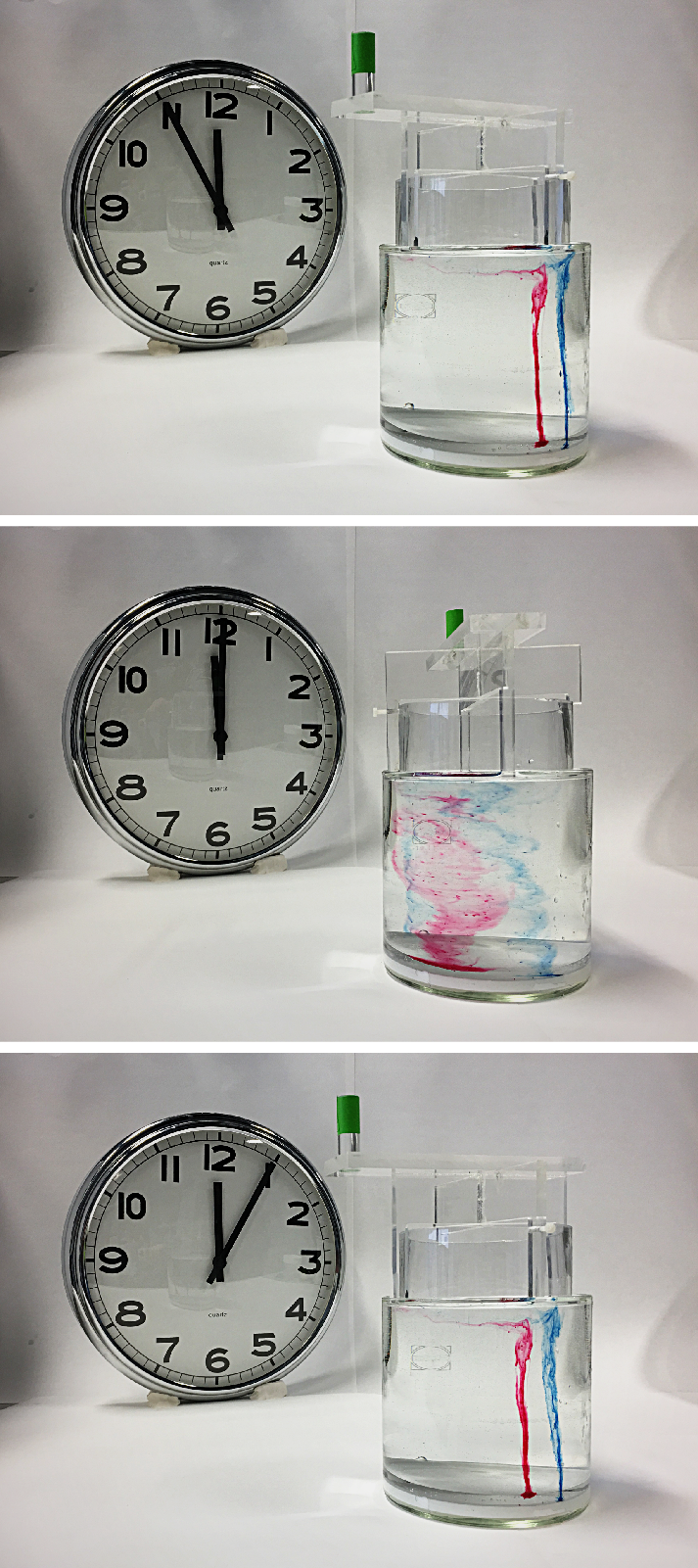
Time-reversibility of Stokes Flows: Dye has been injected into a viscous fluid sandwiched between two concentric cylinders (top panel). The core cylinder is then rotated to shear the dye into a spiral as viewed from above. The dye appears to be mixed with the fluid viewed from the side (middle panel). The rotation is then reversed bringing the cylinder to its original position. The dye "unmixes" (bottom panel). Reversal is not perfect because some diffusion of dye occurs.

While these properties are true for incompressible Newtonian Stokes flows, the non-linear and sometimes time-dependent nature of non-Newtonian fluids means that they do not hold in the more general case.

==== Stokes paradox ====
An interesting property of Stokes flow is known as the Stokes' paradox: that there can be no Stokes flow of a fluid around a disk in two dimensions; or, equivalently, the fact there is no non-trivial solution for the Stokes equations around an infinitely long cylinder.

=== Demonstration of time-reversibility ===
A Taylor–Couette system can create laminar flows in which concentric cylinders of fluid move past each other in an apparent spiral. A fluid such as corn syrup with high viscosity fills the gap between two cylinders, with colored regions of the fluid visible through the transparent outer cylinder. The cylinders are rotated relative to one another at a low speed, which together with the high viscosity of the fluid and thinness of the gap gives a low Reynolds number, so that the apparent mixing of colors is actually laminar and can then be reversed to approximately the initial state. This creates a dramatic demonstration of seemingly mixing a fluid and then unmixing it by reversing the direction of the mixer.

== Incompressible flow of Newtonian fluids ==
In the common case of an incompressible Newtonian fluid, the Stokes equations take the (vectorized) form:

$$\begin{align} \mu \nabla^2 \mathbf{u} -\boldsymbol{\nabla}p + \mathbf{f} &= \boldsymbol{0} \\
\boldsymbol{\nabla}\cdot\mathbf{u}&= 0 \end{align}$$

where $\mathbf{u}$ is the velocity of the fluid, $\boldsymbol{\nabla} p$ is the gradient of the pressure, $\mu$ is the dynamic viscosity, and $\mathbf{f}$ an applied body force. The resulting equations are linear in velocity and pressure, and therefore can take advantage of a variety of linear differential equation solvers.

=== Cartesian coordinates ===
With the velocity vector expanded as $\mathbf{u}=(u,v,w)$ and similarly the body force vector $\mathbf{f} = (f_x, f_y, f_z)$, we may write the vector equation explicitly,

$$\begin{align}
\mu \left(\frac{\partial^2 u}{\partial x^2} + \frac{\partial^2 u}{\partial y^2} + \frac{\partial^2 u}{\partial z^2}\right) - \frac{\partial p}{\partial x} + f_x &= 0 \\
\mu \left(\frac{\partial^2 v}{\partial x^2}  + \frac{\partial^2 v}{\partial y^2} + \frac{\partial^2 v}{\partial z^2}\right) - \frac{\partial p}{\partial y} + f_y &= 0 \\
\mu \left(\frac{\partial^2 w}{\partial x^2}  + \frac{\partial^2 w}{\partial y^2} + \frac{\partial^2 w}{\partial z^2}\right) - \frac{\partial p}{\partial z} + f_z &= 0 \\
{\partial u \over \partial x} + {\partial v \over \partial y} + {\partial w \over \partial z} &= 0
\end{align}$$

We arrive at these equations by making the assumptions that $\mathbb{P} = \mu\left(\boldsymbol{\nabla}\mathbf{u} + (\boldsymbol{\nabla}\mathbf{u})^\mathsf{T}\right) - p\mathbb{I}$ and the density $\rho$ is a constant.

=== Methods of solution ===
==== By stream function ====
The equation for an incompressible Newtonian Stokes flow can be solved by the stream function method in planar or in 3-D axisymmetric cases

Type of function	Geometry	Equation	Comments
Stream function, $\psi$	2-D planar	$\nabla^4 \psi = 0$ or $\Delta^2 \psi = 0$ (biharmonic equation)	$\Delta$ is the Laplacian operator in two dimensions
Stokes stream function, $\Psi$	3-D spherical	$E^2 \Psi = 0,$ where $E = {\partial^2 \over \partial r^2} + {\sin{\theta} \over r^2} {\partial \over \partial \theta} \left({ 1 \over \sin{\theta}} {\partial \over \partial \theta}\right)$	For derivation of the $E$ operator see Stokes stream function#Vorticity
Stokes stream function, $\Psi$	3-D cylindrical	$L_{-1}^2 \Psi = 0,$ where $L_{-1} = \frac{\partial^2}{\partial z^2} + \frac{\partial^2}{\partial \rho^2} - \frac{1}{\rho}\frac{\partial}{\partial\rho}$	For $L_{-1}$ see

==== By Green's function: the Stokeslet ====
The linearity of the Stokes equations in the case of an incompressible Newtonian fluid means that a Green's function, $\mathbb{J}(\mathbf{r})$, exists. The Green's function is found by solving the Stokes equations with the forcing term replaced by a point force acting at the origin, and boundary conditions vanishing at infinity:

$$\begin{align}
\mu \nabla^2 \mathbf{u} -\boldsymbol{\nabla}p &= -\mathbf{F}\cdot\mathbf{\delta}(\mathbf{r})\\
\boldsymbol{\nabla}\cdot\mathbf{u} &= 0 \\
|\mathbf{u}|, p &\to 0 \quad \mbox{as} \quad r\to\infty
\end{align}$$

where $\mathbf{\delta}(\mathbf{r})$ is the Dirac delta function, and $\mathbf{F} \cdot \delta(\mathbf{r})$ represents a point force acting at the origin. The solution for the pressure p and velocity u with |u| and p vanishing at infinity is given by

$$\mathbf{u}(\mathbf{r}) = \mathbf{F} \cdot \mathbb{J}(\mathbf{r}), \qquad
p(\mathbf{r}) = \frac{\mathbf{F}\cdot\mathbf{r}}{4 \pi |\mathbf{r}|^3}$$

where

$$\mathbb{J}(\mathbf{r}) = {1 \over 8\pi\mu} \left( \frac{\mathbb{I}}{|\mathbf{r}|} + \frac{\mathbf{r}\mathbf{r}}{|\mathbf{r}|^3} \right)$$

is a second-rank tensor (or more accurately tensor field) known as the Oseen tensor (after Carl Wilhelm Oseen). Here, r r is a quantity such that $\mathbf{F} \cdot (\mathbf{r} \mathbf{r}) = (\mathbf{F} \cdot \mathbf{r}) \mathbf{r}$.

The terms Stokeslet and point-force solution are used to describe $\mathbf{F}\cdot\mathbb{J}(\mathbf{r})$. Analogous to the point charge in electrostatics, the Stokeslet is force-free everywhere except at the origin, where it contains a force of strength $\mathbf{F}$.

For a continuous-force distribution (density) $\mathbf{f}(\mathbf{r})$ the solution (again vanishing at infinity) can then be constructed by superposition:

$$\mathbf{u}(\mathbf{r}) = \int \mathbf{f}\left(\mathbf{r'}\right) \cdot \mathbb{J}\left(\mathbf{r} - \mathbf{r'}\right) \mathrm{d}\mathbf{r'}, \qquad
p(\mathbf{r}) = \int \frac{\mathbf{f}\left(\mathbf{r'}\right)\cdot\left(\mathbf{r} - \mathbf{r'}\right)}{4 \pi \left|\mathbf{r} - \mathbf{r'}\right|^3} \, \mathrm{d}\mathbf{r'}$$

This integral representation of the velocity can be viewed as a reduction in dimensionality: from the three-dimensional partial differential equation to a two-dimensional integral equation for unknown densities.

==== By Papkovich–Neuber solution ====
The Papkovich–Neuber solution represents the velocity and pressure fields of an incompressible Newtonian Stokes flow in terms of two harmonic potentials.

==== By boundary element method ====
Certain problems, such as the evolution of the shape of a bubble in a Stokes flow, are conducive to numerical solution by the boundary element method. This technique can be applied to both 2- and 3-dimensional flows.

== Some geometries ==
=== Hele-Shaw flow ===
Hele-Shaw flow is an example of a geometry for which inertia forces are negligible. It is defined by two parallel plates arranged very close together with the space between the plates occupied partly by fluid and partly by obstacles in the form of cylinders with generators normal to the plates.

=== Slender-body theory ===
Slender-body theory in Stokes flow is a simple approximate method of determining the irrotational flow field around bodies whose length is large compared with their width. The basis of the method is to choose a distribution of flow singularities along a line (since the body is slender) so that their irrotational flow in combination with a uniform stream approximately satisfies the zero normal velocity condition.

=== Spherical coordinates ===
Horace Lamb's general solution arises from the fact that the pressure $p$ satisfies the Laplace equation, and can be expanded in a series of solid spherical harmonics in spherical coordinates. As a result, the solution to the Stokes equations can be written:

$$\begin{align} \mathbf{u} &= \sum_{n=-\infty, n\neq-1}^{n=\infty} \left[ \frac{(n+3)r^2\nabla p_n}{2\mu(n+1)(2n+3)} - \frac{n\mathbf{x}p_n}{\mu(n+1)(2n+3)}\right] +...\\ \sum_{n=-\infty}^{n=\infty} [\nabla\Phi_n + \nabla \times (\mathbf{x}\chi_n)] \\
p &= \sum_{n=-\infty}^{n=\infty}p_n  \end{align}$$

where $p_n, \Phi_n,$ and $\chi_n$ are solid spherical harmonics of order $n$:

$$\begin{align} p_n &= r^n \sum_{m=0}^{m=n} P_n^m(\cos\theta)(a_{mn}\cos m\phi +\tilde{a}_{mn} \sin m\phi) \\
\Phi_n &= r^n \sum_{m=0}^{m=n} P_n^m(\cos\theta)(b_{mn}\cos m\phi +\tilde{b}_{mn} \sin m\phi) \\
\chi_n &= r^n \sum_{m=0}^{m=n} P_n^m(\cos\theta)(c_{mn}\cos m\phi +\tilde{c}_{mn} \sin m\phi) \end{align}$$

and the $P_n^m$ are the associated Legendre polynomials. The Lamb's solution can be used to describe the motion of fluid either inside or outside a sphere. For example, it can be used to describe the motion of fluid around a spherical particle with prescribed surface flow, a so-called squirmer, or to describe the flow inside a spherical drop of fluid. For interior flows, the terms with $n<0$ are dropped, while for exterior flows the terms with $n>0$ are dropped (often the convention $n\to -n-1$ is assumed for exterior flows to avoid indexing by negative numbers).

== Theorems ==
=== Stokes solution and related Helmholtz theorem ===
The drag resistance to a moving sphere, also known as Stokes' solution, is here summarised. Given a sphere of radius $a$, travelling at velocity $U$, in a Stokes fluid with dynamic viscosity $\mu$, the drag force $F_D$ is given by:

$$F_D = 6 \pi \mu a U$$

The Stokes solution dissipates less energy than any other solenoidal vector field with the same boundary velocities: this is known as the Helmholtz minimum dissipation theorem.

=== Lorentz reciprocal theorem ===
The Lorentz reciprocal theorem states a relationship between two Stokes flows in the same region. Consider fluid filled region $V$ bounded by surface $S$. Let the velocity fields $\mathbf{u}$ and $\mathbf{u}'$ solve the Stokes equations in the domain $V$, each with corresponding stress fields $\mathbf{\sigma}$ and $\mathbf{\sigma}'$. Then the following equality holds:

$$\int_S \mathbf{u}\cdot (\boldsymbol{\sigma}' \cdot \mathbf{n}) dS = \int_S \mathbf{u}' \cdot (\boldsymbol{\sigma} \cdot \mathbf{n}) dS$$

Where $\mathbf{n}$ is the unit normal on the surface $S$. The Lorentz reciprocal theorem can be used to show that Stokes flow "transmits" unchanged the total force and torque from an inner closed surface to an outer enclosing surface. The Lorentz reciprocal theorem can also be used to relate the swimming speed of a microorganism, such as cyanobacterium, to the surface velocity which is prescribed by deformations of the body shape via cilia or flagella. The Lorentz reciprocal theorem has also been used in the context of elastohydrodynamic theory to derive the lift force exerted on a solid object moving tangent to the surface of an elastic interface at low Reynolds numbers.

=== Faxén's laws ===
Faxén's laws are direct relations that express the multipole moments in terms of the ambient flow and its derivatives. First developed by Hilding Faxén to calculate the force, $\mathbf{F}$, and torque, $\mathbf{T}$ on a sphere, they take the following form:

$$\begin{align}
\mathbf{F} &= 6\pi\mu a \left( 1 + \frac{a^2}{6}\nabla^2 \right) \mathbf{v}^\infty(\mathbf{x})|_{x=0} - 6\pi\mu a \mathbf{U} \\
\mathbf{T} &= 8\pi\mu a^3(\mathbf{\Omega}^\infty(\mathbf{x}) - \mathbf{\omega})|_{x=0}
\end{align}$$

where $\mu$ is the dynamic viscosity, $a$ is the particle radius, $\mathbf{v}^{\infty}$ is the ambient flow, $\mathbf{U}$ is the speed of the particle, $\mathbf{\Omega}^{\infty}$ is the angular velocity of the background flow, and $\mathbf{\omega}$ is the angular velocity of the particle.

Faxén's laws can be generalized to describe the moments of other shapes, such as ellipsoids, spheroids, and spherical drops.

== See also ==
- Stokes' law
- Helmholtz minimum dissipation theorem
- Darcy's law
- Hele-Shaw flow
- Taylor scraping flow
- Laminar flow
- Lubrication theory
- Oseen equations
- Poiseuille's law
- Slender-body theory
- Volumetric flow rate
- Faxén's law
