= Faxén =

Faxén is a Swedish surname. Notable people with the surname include:

- Hilding Faxén (1892–1970), Swedish physicist

- Faxén's law

- Magnus Faxén (1930–2018), Swedish journalist, diplomat, and TV executive
