= Helmholtz theorem =

There are several theorems known as the Helmholtz theorem:

- Helmholtz decomposition, also known as the fundamental theorem of vector calculus
- Helmholtz reciprocity in optics
- Helmholtz theorem (classical mechanics)
- Helmholtz's theorems in fluid mechanics
- Helmholtz minimum dissipation theorem

== See also ==
- Helmholtz–Thévenin theorem
