= Thin-film equation =

Differential equation describing the thickness of a liquid film over time

In fluid mechanics, the thin-film equation is a partial differential equation that approximately predicts the time evolution of the thickness h of a liquid film that lies on a surface. The equation is derived via lubrication theory which is based on the assumption that the length-scales in the surface directions are significantly larger than in the direction normal to the surface. In the non-dimensional form of the Navier-Stokes equation the requirement is that terms of order ε^{2} and ε^{2}Re are negligible, where ε ≪ 1 is the aspect ratio and Re is the Reynolds number. This significantly simplifies the governing equations. However, lubrication theory, as the name suggests, is typically derived for flow between two solid surfaces, hence the liquid forms a lubricating layer. The thin-film equation holds when there is a single free surface. With two free surfaces, the flow must be treated as a viscous sheet.

== Definition ==
The basic form of a 2-dimensional thin film equation is

$\frac{\partial h}{\partial t} = -\nabla\cdot \mathbf{Q}$

where the fluid flux $\mathbf{Q}$ is

$\mathbf{Q} = \frac{h^3}{3\mu } \left[\nabla \right(\gamma \nabla^2 h + \rho \mathbf{g} \cdot \mathbf{\hat{e}_n}) + \rho \mathbf{g} \cdot \mathbf{\hat{e}_i}] + \frac{h^2}{2\mu} \mathbf{A}$ ,

and μ is the viscosity (or dynamic viscosity) of the liquid, h(x,y,t) is film thickness, γ is the interfacial tension between the liquid and the gas phase above it, $\rho$ is the liquid density and $\mathbf{A}$ the surface shear. The surface shear could be caused by flow of the overlying gas or surface tension gradients. The vectors $\mathbf{\hat{e}_i}$ represent the unit vector in the surface co-ordinate directions, the dot product serving to identify the gravity component in each direction. The vector $\mathbf{\hat{e}_n}$ is the unit vector perpendicular to the surface.

A generalised thin film equation is discussed in SIAM (Society for Industrial and Applied Mathematics)

$$\frac{\partial h}{\partial t} = -\frac 1 {3\mu} \nabla\cdot \left( h^n \, \nabla \left( \gamma \, \nabla^2 h \right)\right)$$.

When $n<3$ this may represent flow with slip at the solid surface while $n=1$ describes the thickness of a thin bridge between two masses of fluid in a Hele-Shaw cell. The value $n=3$ represents surface tension driven flow.

A form frequently investigated with regard to the rupture of thin liquid films involves the addition of a disjoining pressure Π(h) in the equation, as in

$$\frac{\partial h}{\partial t} = -\frac 1 {3\mu} \nabla\cdot\left(h^3 \nabla \left( \gamma \, \nabla^2 h-\Pi (h) \right)\right)$$

where the function Π(h) is usually very small in value for moderate-large film thicknesses h and grows very rapidly when h goes very close to zero.

== Properties ==
Physical applications, properties and solution behaviour of the thin-film equation are reviewed in Reviews of Modern Physics and SIAM. With the inclusion of phase change at the substrate a form of thin film equation for an arbitrary surface is derived in Physics of Fluids. A detailed study of the steady-flow of a thin film near a moving contact line is given in another SIAM paper. For a yield-stress fluid flow driven by gravity and surface tension is investigated in Journal of Non-Newtonian Fluid Mechanics.

For purely surface tension driven flow it is easy to see that one static (time-independent) solution is a paraboloid of revolution

$$h(x,y) = A - B(x^2 + y^2 ) \,$$

and this is consistent with the experimentally observed spherical cap shape of a static sessile drop, as a "flat" spherical cap that has small height can be accurately approximated in second order with a paraboloid. This, however, does not handle correctly the circumference of the droplet where the value of the function h(x,y) drops to zero and below, as a real physical liquid film can't have a negative thickness. This is one reason why the disjoining pressure term Π(h) is important in the theory.

One possible realistic form of the disjoining pressure term is

$$\Pi (h) = B\left[\left(\frac{h_*} h \right)^n - \left(\frac{h_*} h \right)^m \right]$$

where B, h_{*}, m and n are some parameters. These constants and the surface tension $\gamma$ can be approximately related to the equilibrium liquid-solid contact angle $\theta_e$ through the equation

$$B \approx \frac{(m-1)(n-1)}{h_* (n-m)}\gamma (1-\cos \theta_e )$$.

The thin film equation can be used to simulate several behaviors of liquids, such as the fingering instability in gravity driven flow.

The lack of a second-order time derivative in the thin-film equation is a result of the assumption of small Reynold's number in its derivation, which allows the ignoring of inertial terms dependent on fluid density $\rho$. This is somewhat similar to the situation with Washburn's equation, which describes the capillarity-driven flow of a liquid in a thin tube.

== See also ==
- Partial differential equation
- Lubrication theory
- Disjoining pressure
