= Transition layer =

Transition layer may refer to:

- In mathematics, a mathematical approach to finding an accurate approximation to a problem's solution.
- In aviation, a region of airspace between the transition altitude and the transition level.
