= Pappus (botany) =

Feathery part of a seed of a plant in the family Asteraceae

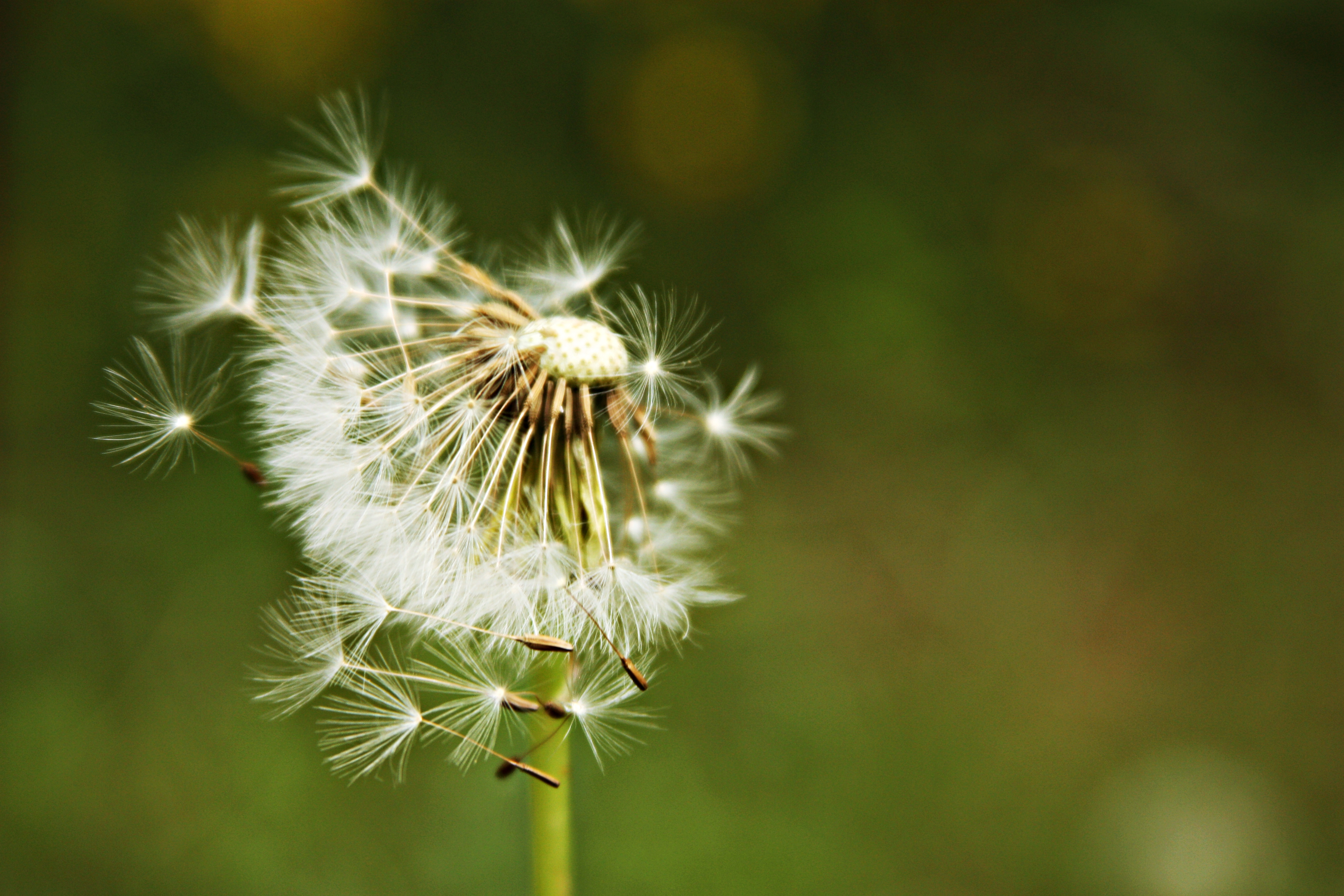
The pappus-clad fruits that make up the familiar "dandelion clock" being dispersed by the wind (family Asteraceae)

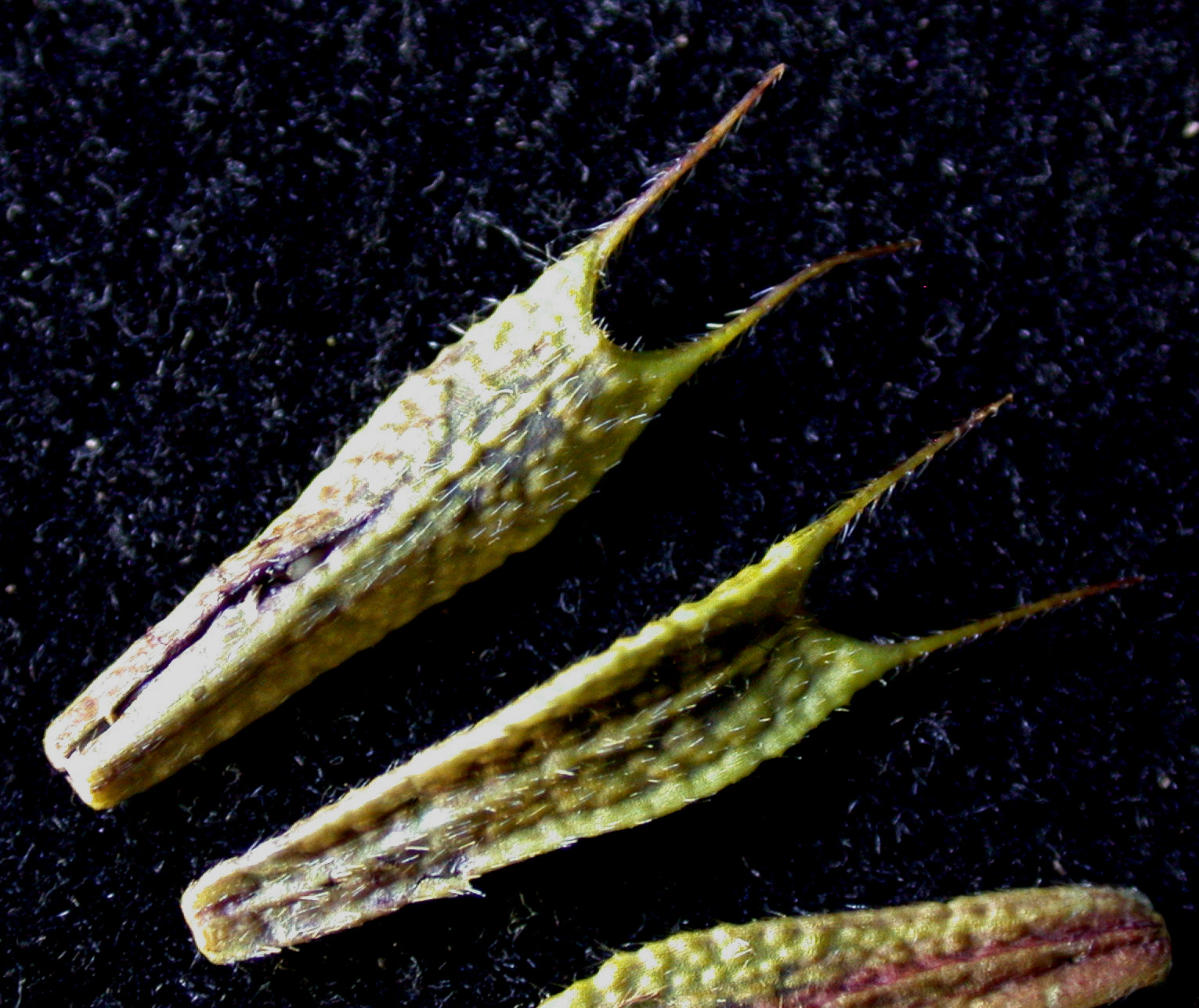
Bidens frondosa achenes with barbed pappus

In Asteraceae, the pappus is the modified calyx, the part of an individual floret, that surrounds the base of the corolla tube in flower. It functions as a dispersal mechanism for the achenes that contain the seeds.

In Asteraceae, the pappus may be composed of bristles (sometimes feathery), awns, scales, or may be absent, and in some species, is too small to see without magnification. In genera such as Taraxacum or Eupatorium, feathery bristles of the pappus function as a "parachute" which enables the seed to be carried by the wind. In genera such as Bidens the pappus has hooks that function in mechanical dispersal.

The name derives from the Ancient Greek word pappos, Latin pappus, meaning "old man", so used for a plant (assumed to be an Erigeron species) having bristles and also for the woolly, hairy seed of certain plants.

The pappus of the dandelion plays a vital role in the wind-aided dispersal of its seeds. By creating a separated vortex ring in its wake, the flight of the pappus is stabilized and more lift and drag are produced. The pappus also has the property of being able to change its morphology in the presence of moisture in various ways that aid germination. The change of shape can adjust the rate of abscission, allowing increased or decreased germination depending on the favorability of conditions.

== Biomimicry ==
The pappus of the dandelion has been studied and reproduced for a variety of applications. It has the ability to retain about 100 times its weight in water and pappus-inspired mechanisms have been proposed and fabricated which would allow highly efficient and specialized liquid transport. Another application of the pappus is in the use of minute airflow detection around walls which is important for measuring small fluctuations in airflow in neonatal incubators or to measure low velocity airflow in heating and ventilation systems.
