= Faxén integral =

In mathematics, the Faxén integral (also named Faxén function) is the following integral

$$\operatorname{Fi}(\alpha,\beta;x)=\int_0^{\infty} \exp(-t+xt^{\alpha})t^{\beta-1}\mathrm{d}t,\qquad (0\leq \operatorname{Re}(\alpha) <1,\;\operatorname{Re}(\beta)>0).$$

The integral is named after the Swedish physicist Olov Hilding Faxén, who published it in 1921 in his PhD thesis.

== n-dimensional Faxén integral ==
More generally one defines the $n$-dimensional Faxén integral as

$$I_n(x)=\lambda_n\int_0^{\infty}\cdots \int_0^{\infty}t_1^{\beta_1-1}\cdots t_n^{\beta_n-1}e^{-f(t_1,\dots,t_n;x)}\mathrm{d}t_1\cdots \mathrm{d}t_n,$$

with

$f(t_1,\dots,t_n;x):=\sum\limits_{j=1}^n t_j^{\mu_j}-xt_1^{\alpha_1}\cdots t_n^{\alpha_n}\quad$ and $\quad\lambda_n:=\prod\limits_{j=1}^n\mu_j$

for $x \in \C$ and

$$(0<\alpha_i <\mu_i,\;\operatorname{Re}(\beta_i)>0,\; i=1,\dots,n).$$

The parameter $\lambda_n$ is only for convenience in calculations.

== Properties ==
Let $\Gamma$ denote the Gamma function, then

- $\operatorname{Fi}(\alpha,\beta;0)=\Gamma(\beta),$
- $\operatorname{Fi}(0,\beta;x)=e^{x}\Gamma(\beta).$

For $\alpha=\beta=\tfrac{1}{3}$ one has the following relationship to the Scorer function

$$\operatorname{Fi}(\tfrac{1}{3},\tfrac{1}{3};x)=3^{2/3}\pi \operatorname{Hi}(3^{-1/3}x).$$

=== Asymptotics ===
For $x\to \infty$ we have the following asymptotics

- $\operatorname{Fi}(\alpha,\beta;-x)\sim \frac{\Gamma(\beta/\alpha)}{\alpha y^{\beta/\alpha}},$
- $\operatorname{Fi}(\alpha,\beta;x)\sim \left(\frac{2\pi}{1-\alpha}\right)^{1/2}(\alpha x)^{(2\beta-1)/(2-2\alpha)}\exp\left((1-\alpha)(\alpha^{\alpha}y)^{1/(1-\alpha)}\right).$
