= Stokes stream function =

Function in fluid dynamics

Streamlines around a sphere in axisymmetric Stokes flow. At terminal velocity the drag force F_{d} balances the force F_{g} propelling the object.

In fluid dynamics, the Stokes stream function is used to describe the streamlines and flow velocity in a three-dimensional incompressible flow with axisymmetry. A surface with a constant value of the Stokes stream function encloses a streamtube, everywhere tangential to the flow velocity vectors. Further, the volume flux within this streamtube is constant, and all the streamlines of the flow are located on this surface. The velocity field associated with the Stokes stream function is solenoidal—it has zero divergence. This stream function is named in honor of George Gabriel Stokes.

== Cylindrical coordinates ==
A point plotted with cylindrical coordinates.

Consider a cylindrical coordinate system ( ρ , φ , z ), with the z–axis the line around which the incompressible flow is axisymmetrical, φ the azimuthal angle and ρ the distance to the z–axis. Then the flow velocity components u_{ρ} and u_{z} can be expressed in terms of the Stokes stream function $\Psi$ by:

$$\begin{align}
u_\rho &= - \frac{1}{\rho}\, \frac{\partial \Psi}{\partial z},
\\
u_z    &= + \frac{1}{\rho}\, \frac{\partial \Psi}{\partial \rho}.
\end{align}$$

The azimuthal velocity component u_{φ} does not depend on the stream function. Due to the axisymmetry, all three velocity components ( u_{ρ} , u_{φ} , u_{z} ) only depend on ρ and z and not on the azimuth φ.

The volume flux, through the surface bounded by a constant value ψ of the Stokes stream function, is equal to 2π ψ.

== Spherical coordinates ==
A point plotted using the spherical coordinate system

In spherical coordinates ( r , θ , φ ), r is the radial distance from the origin, θ is the zenith angle and φ is the azimuthal angle. In axisymmetric flow, with θ = 0 the rotational symmetry axis, the quantities describing the flow are again independent of the azimuth φ. The flow velocity components u_{r} and u_{θ} are related to the Stokes stream function $\Psi$ through:

$$\begin{align}
u_r      &= + \frac{1}{r^2\, \sin \theta}\, \frac{\partial \Psi}{\partial \theta},
\\
u_\theta &= - \frac{1}{r\, \sin \theta}\, \frac{\partial \Psi}{\partial r}.
\end{align}$$

Again, the azimuthal velocity component u_{φ} is not a function of the Stokes stream function ψ. The volume flux through a stream tube, bounded by a surface of constant ψ, equals 2π ψ, as before.

=== Vorticity ===
The vorticity is defined as:

$\boldsymbol{\omega} = \nabla \times \boldsymbol{u} = \nabla \times \nabla \times \boldsymbol{\psi}$, where $\boldsymbol{\psi}=\frac{\Psi}{r\sin\theta}\boldsymbol{\hat \phi},$

with $\boldsymbol{\hat \phi}$ the unit vector in the $\phi\,$–direction.

Derivation of vorticity $\boldsymbol{\omega}$ using a Stokes stream function
Consider the vorticity as defined by

$$\boldsymbol{\omega} = \nabla \times \boldsymbol{u}.$$

From the definition of the curl in spherical coordinates:

$$\begin{align}
\omega_r      &= {1 \over r\sin\theta}\left({\partial \over \partial \theta} \left( u_\phi\sin\theta \right) - {\partial u_\theta \over \partial \phi}\right) \boldsymbol{\hat r}, \\
\omega_\theta &= {1 \over r}\left({1 \over \sin\theta}{\partial u_r \over \partial \phi} - {\partial \over \partial r} \left( r u_\phi \right) \right) \boldsymbol{\hat \theta}, \\
\omega_\phi   &= {1 \over r}\left({\partial \over \partial r} \left( r u_\theta \right) - {\partial u_r \over \partial \theta}\right) \boldsymbol{\hat \phi}.
\end{align}$$

First notice that the $r$ and $\theta$ components are equal to 0. Secondly substitute $u_r$ and $u_\theta$ into $\omega_\phi.$ The result is:

$$\begin{align}
\omega_r      &= 0, \\
\omega_\theta &= 0, \\
\omega_\phi   &= {1 \over r}\left({\partial \over \partial r} \left( r \left(-\frac{1}{r \sin\theta}\frac{\partial\Psi}{\partial r}\right) \right) -
{\partial \over \partial \theta}\left(\frac{1}{r^2 \sin\theta}\frac{\partial\Psi}{\partial \theta}\right)\right).
\end{align}$$

Next the following algebra is performed:

$$\begin{align}
\omega_\phi   &= {1 \over r}\left(-\frac{1}{\sin\theta}\left({\partial \over \partial r} \left(\frac{\partial\Psi}{\partial r}\right)\right) -
\frac{1}{r^2 }{\partial \over \partial \theta}\left(\frac{1}{\sin\theta}\frac{\partial\Psi}{\partial \theta}\right)\right) \\
&= {1 \over r}\left(-\frac{1}{\sin\theta}\left(\frac{\partial^2\Psi}{\partial r^2}\right) -
\frac{\sin\theta}{r^2 \sin\theta}{\partial \over \partial \theta}\left(\frac{1}{\sin\theta}\frac{\partial\Psi}{\partial \theta}\right)\right) \\
&= -\frac{1}{r\sin\theta} \left(\frac{\partial^2\Psi}{\partial r^2} + \frac{\sin\theta}{r^2}{\partial \over \partial \theta}\left(\frac{1}{\sin\theta}\frac{\partial\Psi}{\partial \theta}\right)\right).
\end{align}$$

As a result, from the calculation the vorticity vector is found to be equal to:

$$\boldsymbol{\omega} =
\begin{pmatrix}
0 \\[1ex]
0 \\[1ex]
\displaystyle -\frac{1}{r\sin\theta} \left(\frac{\partial^2\Psi}{\partial r^2} + \frac{\sin\theta}{r^2}{\partial \over \partial \theta}\left(\frac{1}{\sin\theta}\frac{\partial\Psi}{\partial \theta}\right)\right)
\end{pmatrix}.$$

=== Comparison with cylindrical ===
The cylindrical and spherical coordinate systems are related through

$z = r\, \cos\theta\,$ and $\rho = r\, \sin\theta.\,$

== Alternative definition with opposite sign ==
As explained in the general stream function article, definitions using an opposite sign convention – for the relationship between the Stokes stream function and flow velocity – are also in use.

== Zero divergence ==
In cylindrical coordinates, the divergence of the velocity field u becomes:

$$\begin{align}
\nabla \cdot \boldsymbol{u} &=
\frac{1}{\rho} \frac{\partial}{\partial \rho}\Bigl( \rho\, u_\rho \Bigr)
+ \frac{\partial u_z}{\partial z}
\\
&=
\frac{1}{\rho} \frac{\partial}{\partial \rho} \left( - \frac{\partial \Psi}{\partial z} \right)
+ \frac{\partial}{\partial z} \left( \frac{1}{\rho} \frac{\partial \Psi}{\partial \rho} \right)
= 0,
\end{align}$$

as expected for an incompressible flow.

And in spherical coordinates:

$$\begin{align}
\nabla \cdot \boldsymbol{u} &=
\frac{1}{r\, \sin\theta} \frac{\partial}{\partial \theta}( u_\theta\, \sin\theta)
+ \frac{1}{r^2} \frac{\partial}{\partial r}\Bigl( r^2\, u_r \Bigr)
\\
&=
\frac{1}{r\, \sin\theta} \frac{\partial}{\partial \theta} \left( - \frac{1}{r} \frac{\partial \Psi}{\partial r} \right)
+ \frac{1}{r^2} \frac{\partial}{\partial r} \left( \frac{1}{\sin\theta} \frac{\partial \Psi}{\partial \theta} \right)
= 0.
\end{align}$$

== Streamlines as curves of constant stream function ==
From calculus it is known that the gradient vector $\nabla \Psi$ is normal to the curve $\Psi = C$ (see e.g. Level set#Level sets versus the gradient). If it is shown that everywhere $\boldsymbol{u} \cdot \nabla \Psi = 0,$ using the formula for $\boldsymbol{u}$ in terms of $\Psi,$ then this proves that level curves of $\Psi$ are streamlines.

Cylindrical coordinates

In cylindrical coordinates,

$$\nabla \Psi = {\partial \Psi \over \partial \rho} \boldsymbol{e}_\rho + {\partial \Psi \over \partial z} \boldsymbol{e}_z$$.

and

$$\boldsymbol{u} = u_\rho \boldsymbol{e}_\rho + u_z \boldsymbol{e}_z = - {1 \over \rho} {\partial \Psi \over \partial z} \boldsymbol{e}_\rho + {1 \over \rho} {\partial \Psi \over \partial \rho} \boldsymbol{e}_z.$$

So that

$$\nabla \Psi \cdot \boldsymbol{u} = {\partial \Psi \over \partial \rho} (- {1 \over \rho} {\partial \Psi \over \partial z}) + {\partial \Psi \over \partial z} {1 \over \rho} {\partial \Psi \over \partial \rho} = 0.$$

Spherical coordinates

And in spherical coordinates

$$\nabla \Psi = {\partial \Psi \over \partial r} \boldsymbol{e}_r + {1 \over r} {\partial \Psi \over \partial \theta} \boldsymbol{e}_\theta$$

and

$$\boldsymbol{u} = u_r \boldsymbol{e}_r + u_\theta \boldsymbol{e}_\theta = {1 \over r^2 \sin \theta} {\partial \Psi \over \partial \theta} \boldsymbol{e}_r - {1 \over r \sin \theta} {\partial \Psi \over \partial r} \boldsymbol{e}_\theta .$$

So that

$$\nabla \Psi \cdot \boldsymbol{u} = {\partial \Psi \over \partial r} \cdot {1 \over r^2 \sin \theta} {\partial \Psi \over \partial \theta} + {1 \over r} {\partial \Psi \over \partial \theta} \cdot \Big( - {1 \over r \sin \theta} {\partial \Psi \over \partial r} \Big) = 0 .$$
