= Papkovich–Neuber solution =

The Papkovich–Neuber solution is a technique for generating analytic solutions to the Newtonian incompressible Stokes equations, though it was originally developed to solve the equations of linear elasticity. It was derived independently in the early 1930s and named after Peter Feodorovich Papkovich and Heinz Neuber.

It can be shown that any Stokes flow with body force $\mathbf{f}=0$ can be written in the form:

$$\mathbf{u} = {1\over{2 \mu}} \left[ \nabla ( \mathbf{x} \cdot \mathbf{\Phi} + \chi) - 2 \mathbf{\Phi} \right]$$
$$p = \nabla \cdot \mathbf{\Phi}$$

where $\mathbf{\Phi}$ is a harmonic vector potential and $\chi$ is a harmonic scalar potential. The properties and ease of construction of harmonic functions makes the Papkovich–Neuber solution a powerful technique for solving the Stokes Equations in a variety of domains.
