= Fluid dynamics =

Aspects of fluid mechanics involving fluid flow

Computer generated animation of fluid in a tube flowing past a cylinder, showing the shedding of a series of vortices in the flow behind it, called a von Kármán vortex street. The streamlines show the direction of the fluid flow, and the color gradient shows the pressure at each point, from blue to green, yellow, and red indicating increasing pressure

Typical aerodynamic teardrop shape, assuming a viscous medium passing from left to right, the diagram shows the pressure distribution as the thickness of the black line and shows the velocity in the boundary layer as the violet triangles. The green vortex generators prompt the transition to turbulent flow and prevent back-flow also called flow separation from the high-pressure region in the back. The surface in front is as smooth as possible or even employs shark-like skin, as any turbulence here increases the energy of the airflow. The truncation on the right, known as a Kammback, also prevents backflow from the high-pressure region in the back across the spoilers to the convergent part.

In physics, physical chemistry, and engineering, fluid dynamics is a subdiscipline of fluid mechanics that describes the flow of fluids – liquids and gases. It has several subdisciplines, including aerodynamics (the study of air and other gases in motion) and hydrodynamics (the study of water and other liquids in motion). Fluid dynamics has a wide range of applications, including calculating forces and moments on aircraft, determining the mass flow rate of petroleum through pipelines, predicting weather patterns, understanding nebulae in interstellar space, understanding large scale geophysical flows involving oceans/atmosphere and modelling fission weapon detonation.

Fluid dynamics offers a systematic structure—which underlies these practical disciplines—that embraces empirical and semi-empirical laws derived from flow measurement and used to solve practical problems. The solution to a fluid dynamics problem typically involves the calculation of various properties of the fluid, such as flow velocity, pressure, density, and temperature, as functions of space and time.

Before the twentieth century, "hydrodynamics" was synonymous with fluid dynamics. This is still reflected in names of some fluid dynamics topics, like magnetohydrodynamics and hydrodynamic stability, both of which can also be applied to gases.

== Equations ==
The foundational axioms of fluid dynamics are the conservation laws, specifically, conservation of mass, conservation of linear momentum, and conservation of energy (also known as the first law of thermodynamics). These are based on classical mechanics and are modified in quantum mechanics and general relativity. They are expressed using the Reynolds transport theorem.

In addition to the above, fluids are assumed to obey the continuum assumption. At small scale, all fluids are composed of molecules that collide with one another and solid objects. However, the continuum assumption assumes that fluids are continuous, rather than discrete. Consequently, it is assumed that properties such as density, pressure, temperature, and flow velocity are well-defined at infinitesimally small points in space and vary continuously from one point to another. The fact that the fluid is made up of discrete molecules is ignored.

For fluids that are sufficiently dense to be a continuum, do not contain ionized species, and have flow velocities that are small in relation to the speed of light, the momentum equations for Newtonian fluids are the Navier–Stokes equations—which is a non-linear set of differential equations that describes the flow of a fluid whose stress depends linearly on flow velocity gradients and pressure. The unsimplified equations do not have a general closed-form solution, so they are primarily of use in computational fluid dynamics. The equations can be simplified in several ways, all of which make them easier to solve. Some of the simplifications allow some simple fluid dynamics problems to be solved in closed form.

In addition to the mass, momentum, and energy conservation equations, a thermodynamic equation of state that gives the pressure as a function of other thermodynamic variables is required to completely describe the problem. An example of this would be the perfect gas equation of state:

$$p= \frac{\rho R_u T}{M}$$

where p is pressure, ρ is density, and T is the absolute temperature, while R_{u} is the gas constant and M is molar mass for a particular gas. A constitutive relation may also be useful.

=== Conservation laws ===
Three conservation laws are used to solve fluid dynamics problems, and may be written in integral or differential form. The conservation laws may be applied to a region of the flow called a control volume. A control volume is a discrete volume in space through which fluid is assumed to flow. The integral formulations of the conservation laws are used to describe the change of mass, momentum, or energy within the control volume. Differential formulations of the conservation laws apply Stokes' theorem to yield an expression that may be interpreted as the integral form of the law applied to an infinitesimally small volume (at a point) within the flow.

Mass continuity (conservation of mass)
The rate of change of fluid mass inside a control volume must be equal to the net rate of fluid flow into the volume. Physically, this statement requires that mass is neither created nor destroyed in the control volume, and can be translated into the integral form of the continuity equation:

$\frac{\partial}{\partial t} \iiint_V \rho \, dV = - \, {}$ ${\scriptstyle S}$ ${}\,\rho\mathbf{u}\cdot d\mathbf{S}$

Above, ρ is the fluid density, u is the flow velocity vector, and t is time. The left-hand side of the above expression is the rate of increase of mass within the volume and contains a triple integral over the control volume, whereas the right-hand side contains an integration over the surface of the control volume of mass convected into the system. Mass flow into the system is accounted as positive, and since the normal vector to the surface is opposite to the sense of flow into the system the term is negated. The differential form of the continuity equation is, by the divergence theorem:

$$\ \frac{\partial \rho}{\partial t} + \nabla \cdot (\rho \mathbf{u}) = 0$$
Conservation of momentum
Newton's second law of motion applied to a control volume, is a statement that any change in momentum of the fluid within that control volume will be due to the net flow of momentum into the volume and the action of external forces acting on the fluid within the volume.

$\frac{\partial}{\partial t} \iiint_{\scriptstyle V} \rho\mathbf{u} \, dV = -\, {}$ $_{\scriptstyle S}$ $(\rho\mathbf{u}\cdot d\mathbf{S}) \mathbf{u} -{}$ ${\scriptstyle S}$ ${}\, p \, d\mathbf{S}$ $\displaystyle{}+ \iiint_{\scriptstyle V} \rho \mathbf{f}_\text{body} \, dV + \mathbf{F}_\text{surf}$

In the above integral formulation of this equation, the term on the left is the net change of momentum within the volume. The first term on the right is the net rate at which momentum is convected into the volume. The second term on the right is the force due to pressure on the volume's surfaces. The first two terms on the right are negated since momentum entering the system is accounted as positive, and the normal is opposite the direction of the velocity u and pressure forces. The third term on the right is the net acceleration of the mass within the volume due to any body forces (here represented by f_{body}). Surface forces, such as viscous forces, are represented by F_{surf}, the net force due to shear forces acting on the volume surface. The momentum balance can also be written for a moving control volume.

The following is the differential form of the momentum conservation equation. Here, the volume is reduced to an infinitesimally small point, and both surface and body forces are accounted for in one total force, F. For example, F may be expanded into an expression for the frictional and gravitational forces acting at a point in a flow.
$$\frac{D \mathbf{u}}{D t} = \mathbf{F} - \frac{\nabla p}{\rho}$$

In aerodynamics, air is assumed to be a Newtonian fluid, which posits a linear relationship between the shear stress (due to internal friction forces) and the rate of strain of the fluid. The equation above is a vector equation in a three-dimensional flow, but it can be expressed as three scalar equations in three coordinate directions. The conservation of momentum equations for the compressible, viscous flow case is called the Navier–Stokes equations.
Conservation of energy
Although energy can be converted from one form to another, the total energy in a closed system remains constant.
$$\rho \frac{Dh}{Dt} = \frac{Dp}{Dt} + \nabla \cdot \left( k \nabla T\right) + \Phi$$
Above, h is the specific enthalpy, k is the thermal conductivity of the fluid, T is temperature, and Φ is the viscous dissipation function. The viscous dissipation function governs the rate at which the mechanical energy of the flow is converted to heat. The second law of thermodynamics requires that the dissipation term is always positive: viscosity cannot create energy within the control volume. The expression on the left side is a material derivative.

== Classifications ==
=== Compressible versus incompressible flow ===
All fluids are compressible to an extent; that is, changes in pressure or temperature cause changes in density. However, in many situations the changes in pressure and temperature are sufficiently small that the changes in density are negligible. In this case the flow can be modelled as an incompressible flow. Otherwise the more general compressible flow equations must be used.

Mathematically, incompressibility is expressed by saying that the density ρ of a fluid parcel does not change as it moves in the flow field, that is,
$$\frac{\mathrm{D} \rho}{\mathrm{D}t} = 0 \, ,$$
where D/Dt is the material derivative, which is the sum of local and convective derivatives. This additional constraint simplifies the governing equations, especially in the case when the fluid has a uniform density.

For flow of gases, to determine whether to use compressible or incompressible fluid dynamics, the Mach number of the flow is evaluated. As a rough guide, compressible effects can be ignored at Mach numbers below approximately 0.3. For liquids, whether the incompressible assumption is valid depends on the fluid properties (specifically the critical pressure and temperature of the fluid) and the flow conditions (how close to the critical pressure the actual flow pressure becomes). Acoustic problems always require allowing compressibility, since sound waves are compression waves involving changes in pressure and density of the medium through which they propagate.

=== Newtonian versus non-Newtonian fluids ===
Flow around an airfoil

All fluids, except superfluids, are viscous, meaning that they exert some resistance to deformation: neighbouring parcels of fluid moving at different velocities exert viscous forces on each other. The velocity gradient is referred to as a strain rate; it has dimensions T^{−1}. Isaac Newton showed that for many familiar fluids such as water and air, the stress due to these viscous forces is linearly related to the strain rate. Such fluids are called Newtonian fluids. The coefficient of proportionality is called the fluid's viscosity; for Newtonian fluids, it is a fluid property that is independent of the strain rate.

Non-Newtonian fluids have a more complicated, non-linear stress-strain behaviour. The sub-discipline of rheology describes the stress-strain behaviours of such fluids, which include emulsions and slurries, some viscoelastic materials such as blood and some polymers, and sticky liquids such as latex, honey and lubricants.

=== Inviscid versus viscous versus Stokes flow ===
The dynamic of fluid parcels is described with the help of Newton's second law. An accelerating parcel of fluid is subject to inertial effects.

The Reynolds number is a dimensionless quantity which characterises the magnitude of inertial effects compared to the magnitude of viscous effects. A low Reynolds number (Re ≪ 1) indicates that viscous forces are very strong compared to inertial forces. In such cases, inertial forces are sometimes neglected; this flow regime is called Stokes or creeping flow.

In contrast, high Reynolds numbers (Re ≫ 1) indicate that the inertial effects have more effect on the velocity field than the viscous (friction) effects. In high Reynolds number flows, the flow is often modeled as an inviscid flow, an approximation in which viscosity is completely neglected. Eliminating viscosity allows the Navier–Stokes equations to be simplified into the Euler equations. The integration of the Euler equations along a streamline in an inviscid flow yields Bernoulli's equation. When, in addition to being inviscid, the flow is irrotational everywhere, Bernoulli's equation can completely describe the flow everywhere. Such flows are called potential flows, because the velocity field may be expressed as the gradient of a potential energy expression.

This idea can work fairly well when the Reynolds number is high. However, problems such as those involving solid boundaries may require that the viscosity be included. Viscosity cannot be neglected near solid boundaries because the no-slip condition generates a thin region of large strain rate, the boundary layer, in which viscosity effects dominate and which thus generates vorticity. Therefore, to calculate net forces on bodies (such as wings), viscous flow equations must be used: inviscid flow theory fails to predict drag forces, a limitation known as the d'Alembert's paradox.

A commonly used model, especially in computational fluid dynamics, is to use two flow models: the Euler equations away from the body, and boundary layer equations in a region close to the body. The two solutions can then be matched with each other, using the method of matched asymptotic expansions.

=== Steady versus unsteady flow ===
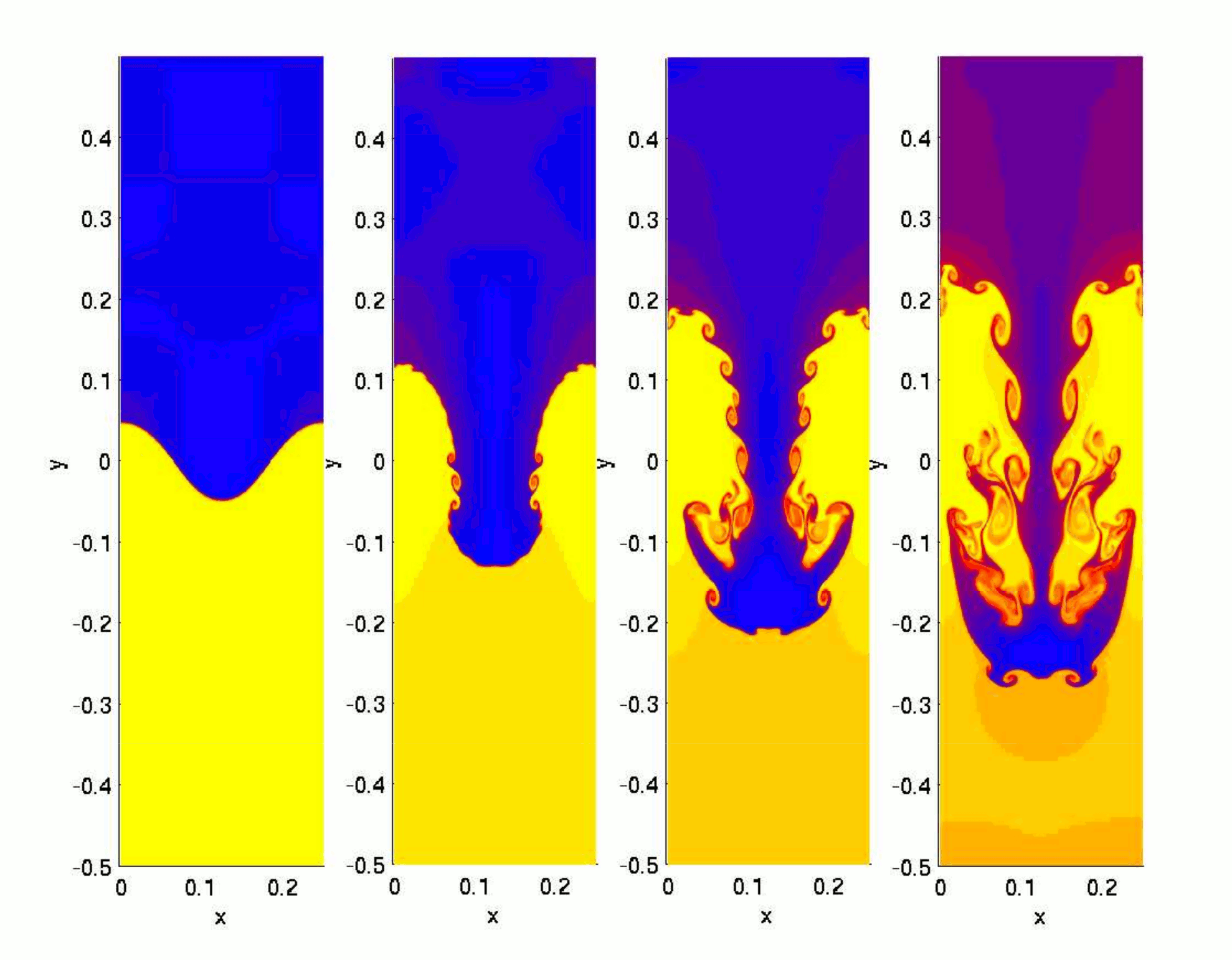
Hydrodynamics simulation of the Rayleigh–Taylor instability

A flow that is not a function of time is called steady flow/laminar flow. Steady-state flow refers to the condition where the fluid properties at a point in the system do not change over time. Time dependent flow is known as unsteady (also called transient). Whether a particular flow is steady or unsteady, can depend on the chosen frame of reference. For instance, laminar flow over a sphere is steady in the frame of reference that is stationary with respect to the sphere. In a frame of reference that is stationary with respect to a background flow, the flow is unsteady.

Turbulent flows (or nonsteady or nonlaminar) are unsteady by definition. A turbulent flow can, however, be statistically stationary. The random velocity field U(x, t) is statistically stationary if all statistics are invariant under a shift in time. This roughly means that all statistical properties are constant in time. Often, the mean field is the object of interest, and this is constant too in a statistically stationary flow.

Steady flows are often more tractable than otherwise similar unsteady flows. The governing equations of a steady problem have one dimension fewer (time) than the governing equations of the same problem without taking advantage of the steadiness of the flow field.

=== Laminar versus turbulent flow ===
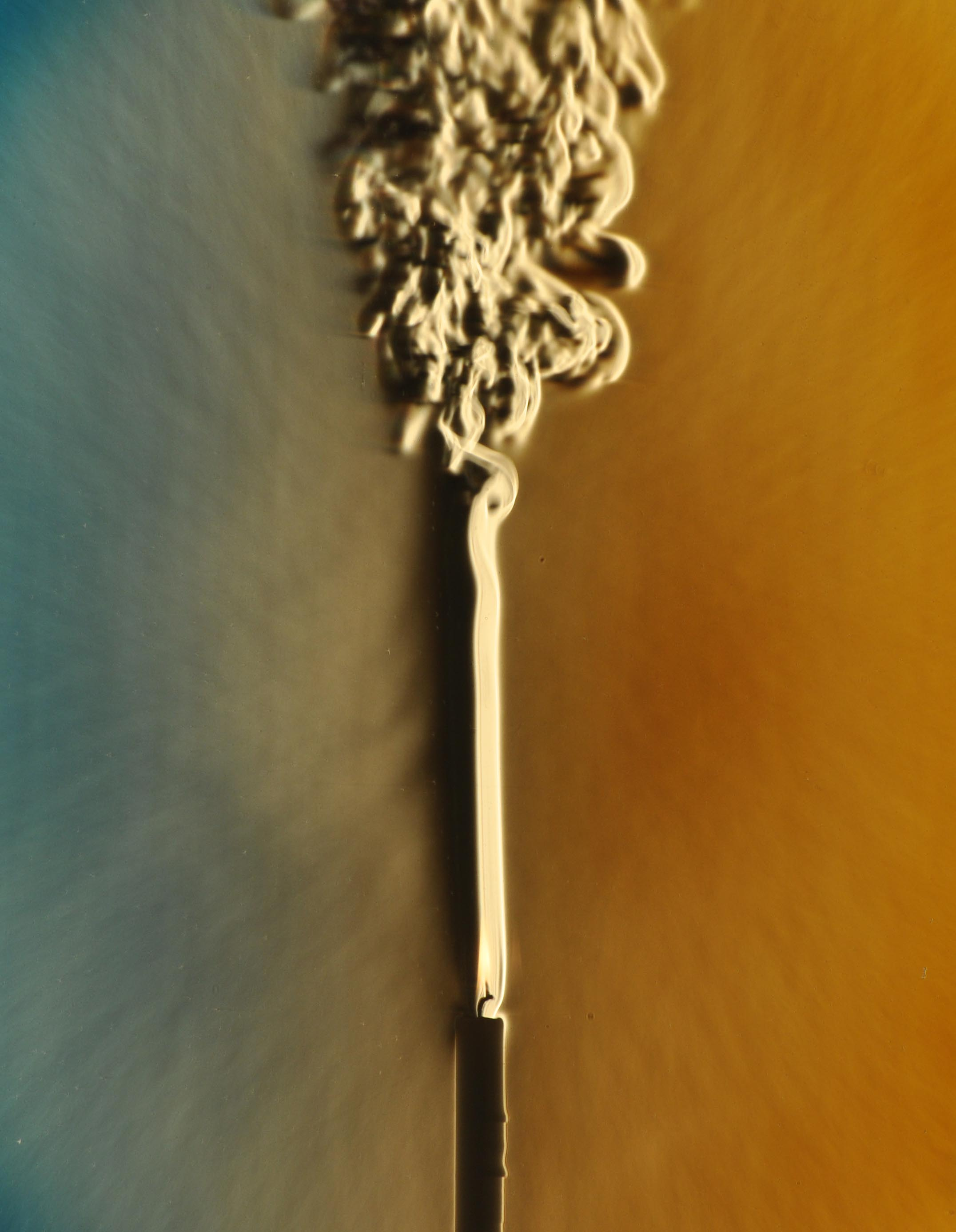
The transition from laminar to turbulent flow

Turbulence is flow characterized by recirculation, eddies, and apparent randomness. Flow in which turbulence is not exhibited is called laminar. The presence of eddies or recirculation alone does not necessarily indicate turbulent flow—these phenomena may be present in laminar flow as well. Mathematically, turbulent flow is often represented via a Reynolds decomposition, in which the flow is broken down into the sum of an average component and a perturbation component.

It is believed that turbulent flows can be described well through the use of the Navier–Stokes equations. Direct numerical simulation (DNS), based on the Navier–Stokes equations, makes it possible to simulate turbulent flows at moderate Reynolds numbers. Restrictions depend on the power of the computer used and the efficiency of the solution algorithm. The results of DNS have been found to agree well with experimental data for some flows.

Most flows of interest have Reynolds numbers much too high for DNS to be a viable option, given the state of computational power for the next few decades. Any flight vehicle large enough to carry a human (L > 3 m), moving faster than 20 m/s (72 km/h; 45 mph) is well beyond the limit of DNS simulation (Re = 4 million). Transport aircraft wings (such as on an Airbus A300 or Boeing 747) have Reynolds numbers of 40 million (based on the wing chord dimension). Solving these real-life flow problems requires turbulence models for the foreseeable future. Reynolds-averaged Navier–Stokes equations (RANS) combined with turbulence modelling provides a model of the effects of the turbulent flow. Such a modelling mainly provides the additional momentum transfer by the Reynolds stresses, although the turbulence also enhances the heat and mass transfer. Another promising methodology is large eddy simulation (LES), especially in the form of detached eddy simulation (DES) — a combination of LES and RANS turbulence modelling.

=== Other approximations ===
There are a large number of other possible approximations to fluid dynamic problems. Some of the more commonly used are listed below.

- The Boussinesq approximation neglects variations in density except to calculate buoyancy forces. It is often used in free convection problems where density changes are small.
- Lubrication theory and Hele–Shaw flow exploits the large aspect ratio of the domain to show that certain terms in the equations are small and so can be neglected.
- Slender-body theory is a methodology used in Stokes flow problems to estimate the force on, or flow field around, a long slender object in a viscous fluid.
- The shallow-water equations can be used to describe a layer of relatively inviscid fluid with a free surface, in which surface gradients are small.
- Darcy's law is used for flow in porous media, and works with variables averaged over several pore-widths.
- In rotating systems, the quasi-geostrophic equations assume an almost perfect balance between pressure gradients and the Coriolis force. It is useful in the study of atmospheric dynamics.

== Multidisciplinary types ==
=== Flows according to Mach regimes ===
While many flows (such as flow of water through a pipe) occur at low Mach numbers (subsonic flows), many flows of practical interest in aerodynamics or in turbomachines occur at high fractions of M = 1 (transonic flows) or in excess of it (supersonic or even hypersonic flows). New phenomena occur at these regimes such as instabilities in transonic flow, shock waves for supersonic flow, or non-equilibrium chemical behaviour due to ionization in hypersonic flows. In practice, each of those flow regimes is treated separately.

=== Reactive versus non-reactive flows ===
Reactive flows are flows that are chemically reactive, which finds its applications in many areas, including combustion (IC engine), propulsion devices (rockets, jet engines, and so on), detonations, fire and safety hazards, and astrophysics. In addition to conservation of mass, momentum and energy, conservation of individual species (for example, mass fraction of methane in methane combustion) need to be derived, where the production/depletion rate of any species are obtained by simultaneously solving the equations of chemical kinetics.

=== Magnetohydrodynamics ===
Magnetohydrodynamics is the multidisciplinary study of the flow of electrically conducting fluids in electromagnetic fields. Examples of such fluids include plasmas, liquid metals, and salt water. The fluid flow equations are solved simultaneously with Maxwell's equations of electromagnetism.

=== Relativistic fluid dynamics ===
Relativistic fluid dynamics studies the macroscopic and microscopic fluid motion at large velocities comparable to the velocity of light. This branch of fluid dynamics accounts for the relativistic effects both from the special theory of relativity and the general theory of relativity. The governing equations are derived in Riemannian geometry for Minkowski spacetime.

=== Fluctuating hydrodynamics ===
This branch of fluid dynamics augments the standard hydrodynamic equations with stochastic fluxes that model thermal fluctuations. As formulated by Landau and Lifshitz, a white noise contribution obtained from the fluctuation-dissipation theorem of statistical mechanics is added to the viscous stress tensor and heat flux.

== Terminology ==
The concept of pressure is central to the study of both fluid statics and fluid dynamics. A pressure can be identified for every point in a body of fluid, regardless of whether the fluid is in motion or not. Pressure can be measured using an aneroid, Bourdon tube, mercury column, or various other methods.

Some of the terminology that is necessary in the study of fluid dynamics is not found in other similar areas of study. In particular, some of the terminology used in fluid dynamics is not used in fluid statics.

=== Characteristic numbers ===
Dimensionless numbers (or characteristic numbers) have an important role in analyzing the behavior of fluids and their flow as well as in other transport phenomena. They include the Reynolds and the Mach numbers, which describe as ratios the relative magnitude of fluid and physical system characteristics, such as density, viscosity, speed of sound, and flow speed. To compare a real situation (e.g. an aircraft) with a small-scale model it is necessary to keep the important characteristic numbers the same. Names and formulation of these numbers were standardized in ISO 31-12 and in ISO 80000-11.

=== Terminology in incompressible fluid dynamics ===
The concepts of total pressure and dynamic pressure arise from Bernoulli's equation which is only valid when applied to frictionless flows. (These two pressures are not pressures in the usual sense—they cannot be measured using an aneroid, Bourdon tube or mercury column.) To avoid potential ambiguity when referring to pressure in fluid dynamics, many authors use the term static pressure to distinguish it from total pressure and dynamic pressure. Static pressure is identical to pressure and can be identified for every point in a fluid flow field.

A point in a fluid flow where the flow has come to rest (that is to say, speed is equal to zero adjacent to some solid body immersed in the fluid flow) is of special significance. It is of such importance that it is given a special name—a stagnation point. The static pressure at the stagnation point is of special significance and is given its own name—stagnation pressure. Bernoulli's equation is not valid in the boundary layer and the thin film of stationary fluid adjacent to a solid object is not regarded as a stagnation point. Static pressure in the boundary layer is not related to stagnation pressure. In the absence of shocks the stagnation pressure at a stagnation point is equal to the total pressure throughout the flow field.

=== Terminology in compressible fluid dynamics ===
In a compressible fluid, it is convenient to define the total conditions (also called stagnation conditions) for all thermodynamic state properties (such as total temperature, total enthalpy, total speed of sound). These total flow conditions are a function of the fluid velocity and have different values in frames of reference with different motion.

To avoid potential ambiguity when referring to the properties of the fluid associated with the state of the fluid rather than its motion, the prefix "static" is commonly used (such as static temperature and static enthalpy). Where there is no prefix, the fluid property is the static condition (so "density" and "static density" mean the same thing). The static conditions are independent of the frame of reference.

Because the total flow conditions are defined by isentropically bringing the fluid to rest, there is no need to distinguish between total entropy and static entropy as they are always equal by definition. As such, entropy is most commonly referred to as simply "entropy".

== Applications ==
- Acoustics – Branch of physics involving mechanical waves
- Aeronautics – Science of air flight-capable machines
- Astrophysical fluid dynamics – Branch of modern astronomy
- Cryosphere science – Earth's surface where water is frozen
- Geophysical fluid dynamics – Dynamics of naturally occurring flows
- Hemodynamics – Dynamics of blood flow
- Hydraulics – Applied engineering involving liquids
- Hydrology – Science of the movement, distribution, and quality of water on Earth
- Fluidics – Use of a fluid to perform analog or digital operations
- Fluid power – Use of fluids under pressure to generate, control, and transmit power
- Geodynamics – Study of dynamics of the Earth
- Hydraulic machinery – Type of machine that uses liquid fluid power to perform work
- Meteorology – Study of the atmosphere, focusing on weather forecasting
- Naval architecture – Engineering discipline of marine vessels
- Oceanography – Scientific study of the ocean
- Plasma physics – State of matter
- Pneumatics – Use of pressurised gas in mechanical systems
- Ice-sheet dynamics – Large mass of glacial ice

== See also ==
- List of publications in fluid dynamics
- List of fluid dynamicists
