= Distinguished limit =

In mathematics, a distinguished limit is an appropriately chosen scale factor used in the method of matched asymptotic expansions.
