= Faxén's law =

Formula in fluid dynamics

In fluid dynamics, Faxén's laws relate a sphere's velocity $\mathbf{U}$ and angular velocity $\mathbf{\Omega}$ to the forces, torque, stresslet and flow it experiences under low Reynolds number (creeping flow) conditions.

== First law ==
Faxén's first law was introduced in 1922 by Swedish physicist Hilding Faxén, who at the time was active at Uppsala University, and is given by

$$\mathbf{F} = 6 \pi \mu a \left[ \left( 1 + \frac{a^2}{6} \nabla^2\right) \mathbf{u}' - (\mathbf{U} - \mathbf{u}^\infty) \right],$$

where

- $\mathbf{F}$ is the force exerted by the fluid on the sphere
- $\mu$ is the Newtonian viscosity of the solvent in which the sphere is placed
- $a$ is the sphere's radius
- $\mathbf{U}$ is the (translational) velocity of the sphere
- $\mathbf{u}'$ is the disturbance velocity caused by the other spheres in suspension (not by the background impressed flow), evaluated at the sphere centre
- $\mathbf{u}^\infty$ is the background impressed flow, evaluated at the sphere centre (set to zero in some references).

It can also be written in the form

$$\mathbf{U} - \mathbf{u}^\infty = \mathbf{u}' + b_0 \mathbf{F} + \frac{a^2}{6} \nabla^2 \mathbf{u}',$$

where $b_0 = -\frac{1}{6 \pi \mu a}$ is the hydrodynamic mobility.

In the case that the pressure gradient is small compared with the length scale of the sphere's diameter, and when there is no external force, the last two terms of this form may be neglected. In this case the external fluid flow simply advects the sphere.

== Second law ==
Faxén's second law is given by

$$\mathbf{T} = 8 \pi \mu a^3 \left[ \frac{1}{2} \left( \boldsymbol{\nabla} \times \mathbf{u}' \right) - (\mathbf{\Omega} - \mathbf{\Omega}^\infty) \right],$$

where

- $\mathbf{T}$ is the torque exerted by the fluid on the sphere
- $\mathbf{\Omega}$ is the angular velocity of the sphere
- $\mathbf{\Omega}^\infty$ is the angular velocity of the background flow, evaluated at the sphere centre (set to zero in some references).

== 'Third law' ==
George Batchelor and J. T. Green derived an equation for the stresslet, given by

$$\boldsymbol{\mathsf{S}} = \frac{10}{3} \pi \mu a^3 \left[2\boldsymbol{\mathsf{E}}^\infty + \left(1 + \frac{1}{10} a^2 \nabla^2\right) \left(\boldsymbol{\nabla} \mathbf{u}' + (\boldsymbol{\nabla} \mathbf{u}')^\mathrm{T}\right)\right],$$

where

- $\boldsymbol{\mathsf{S}}$ is the stresslet (symmetric part of the first moment of force) exerted by the fluid on the sphere,
- $\boldsymbol{\nabla}\mathbf{u}'$ is the velocity gradient tensor; ${}^\mathrm{T}$ represents transpose; and so $\frac{1}{2}\left[\boldsymbol{\nabla} \mathbf{u}' + (\boldsymbol{\nabla} \mathbf{u}')^\mathrm{T}\right]$ is the rate of strain, or deformation, tensor.
- $\boldsymbol{\mathsf{E}}^\infty = \frac{1}{2}\left[\boldsymbol{\nabla} \mathbf{u}^\infty + (\boldsymbol{\nabla} \mathbf{u}^\infty)^\mathrm{T}\right]$ is the rate of strain of the background flow, evaluated at the sphere centre (set to zero in some references).

Note there is no rate of strain on the sphere (no $\boldsymbol{\mathsf{E}}$) since the spheres are assumed to be rigid.

Faxén's law is a correction to Stokes' law for the friction on spherical objects in a viscous fluid, valid where the object moves close to a wall of the container.

== See also ==
- Immersed boundary method
