= Disjoining pressure =

Difference between the confining and bulk pressures of a phase of matter

In surface chemistry, disjoining pressure (symbol Π_{d}) according to an IUPAC definition arises from an attractive interaction between two surfaces. For two flat and parallel surfaces, the value of the disjoining pressure (i.e., the force per unit area) can be calculated as the derivative of the Gibbs energy of interaction per unit area in respect to distance (in the direction normal to that of the interacting surfaces). There is also a related concept of disjoining force, which can be viewed as disjoining pressure times the surface area of the interacting surfaces.

The concept of disjoining pressure was introduced by Derjaguin (1936) as the difference between the pressure in a region of a phase adjacent to a surface confining it, and the pressure in the bulk of this phase.

== Description ==
Disjoining pressure can be expressed as:

$$\Pi_d = - {1 \over A} \left( \frac{\partial G}{\partial x} \right)_{T,V, A}$$

where (in SI units):

- Π_{d} - disjoining pressure (N/m^{2})
- A - the surface area of the interacting surfaces (m^{2})
- G - total Gibbs energy of the interaction of the two surfaces (J)
- x - distance (m)
- indices T, V and A signify that the temperature, volume, and the surface area remain constant in the derivative.

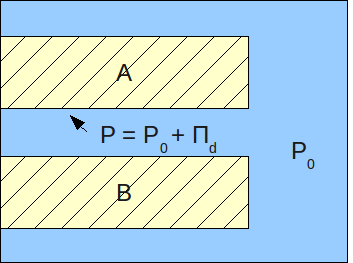
Dependence of the pressure in the film at surface A and the pressure in the bulk

Using the concept of the disjoining pressure, the pressure in a film can be viewed as:

$$P = P_0 + \Pi_d$$

where:

- P - pressure in a film (Pa)
- P_{0} - pressure in the bulk of the same phase as that of the film (Pa)

Disjoining pressure is interpreted as a sum of several interactions: dispersion forces, electrostatic forces between charged surfaces, interactions due to layers of neutral molecules adsorbed on the two surfaces, and the structural effects of the solvent.

Classic theory predicts that the disjoining pressure of a thin liquid film on a flat surface as follows,

$$\Pi_d = - \frac{ A_H }{6 \pi \delta_0^3}$$

where:

- A_{H} - Hamaker constant (J)
- δ_{0} - liquid film thickness (m)

For a solid-liquid-vapor system where the solid surface is structured, the disjoining pressure is affected by the solid surface profile, ζ_{S}, and the meniscus shape, ζ_{L}

$${\Pi_d (x,{\zeta_{\text{L}}(x)})}= \int d^2 \rho {\int_{\zeta_\text{L} (x) - \zeta_\text{S} (x+\rho)}^{+\infty}} dz \omega(\rho,z)$$

where:

- ω(ρ,z) - solid-liquid potential (J/m^{6})

The meniscus shape can be by minimization of total system free energy as follows

$${\delta W_{\text{total}}} = {{\partial W_{\text{total}}} \over {\partial {\zeta_\text{L}}}} \delta \zeta_\text{L} + {{\partial W_{\text{total}}} \over {\partial \zeta_\text{L}^'}} \delta \zeta_\text{L}^'= 0$$

where:

- W_{total} - total system free energy including surface excess energy and free energy due to solid-liquid interactions (J/m^{2})
- ζ_{L} - meniscus shape (m)
- ζ'_{L} - slope of meniscus shape (1)

In the theory of liquid drops and films, the disjoining pressure can be shown to be related to the equilibrium liquid-solid contact angle θ_{e} through the relation

$$\cos \theta_e = 1 + \frac{1}{\gamma}\int_{h_0}^{\infty}\Pi_D (h) dh ,$$

where γ is the liquid-vapor surface tension and h_{0} is the precursor film thickness.

== See also ==
- Capillary condensation
- Capillary pressure
- Hamaker constant
- Thin-film equation
