= Hele-Shaw flow =

Concept in fluid mechanics

Hele-Shaw flow is defined as flow taking place between two parallel flat plates separated by a narrow gap satisfying certain conditions, named after Henry Selby Hele-Shaw, who studied the problem in 1898. Various problems in fluid mechanics can be approximated to Hele-Shaw flows and thus the research of these flows is of importance. Approximation to Hele-Shaw flow is specifically important to micro-flows. This is due to manufacturing techniques, which creates shallow planar configurations, and the typically low Reynolds numbers of micro-flows.

The conditions that needs to be satisfied are

$$\frac{h}{l} \ll 1, \qquad \frac{Uh}{\nu} \frac{h}{l} \ll 1$$

where $h$ is the gap width between the plates, $U$ is the characteristic velocity scale, $l$ is the characteristic length scale in directions parallel to the plate and $\nu$ is the kinematic viscosity. Specifically, the Reynolds number $\mathrm{Re}=Uh/\nu$ need not always be small, but can be order unity or greater as long as it satisfies the condition $\mathrm{Re}(h/l) \ll 1.$ In terms of the Reynolds number $\mathrm{Re}_l = Ul/\nu$ based on $l$, the condition becomes $\mathrm{Re}_l (h/l)^2 \ll 1.$

The governing equation of Hele-Shaw flows is identical to that of the inviscid potential flow and to the flow of fluid through a porous medium (Darcy's law). It thus permits visualization of this kind of flow in two dimensions.

== Mathematical formulation ==
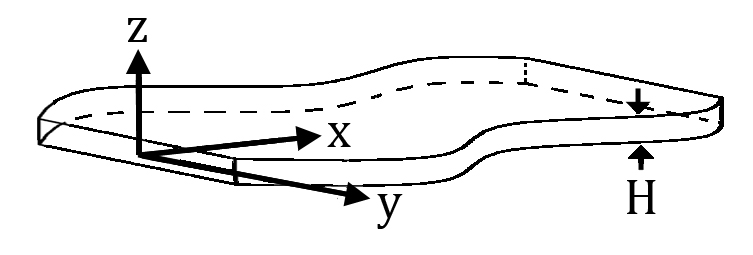
A schematic description of a Hele-Shaw configuration.

Let $x$, $y$ be the directions parallel to the flat plates, and $z$ the perpendicular direction, with $h$ being the gap between the plates (at $z=0, h$) and $l$ be the relevant characteristic length scale in the $xy$-directions. Under the limits mentioned above, the incompressible Navier–Stokes equations, in the first approximation becomes

$$\begin{align}
\frac{\partial p}{\partial x} = \mu \frac{\partial^2 v_x}{\partial z^2}, \quad \frac{\partial p}{\partial y} &= \mu \frac{\partial^2 v_y}{\partial z^2}, \quad\frac{\partial p}{\partial z} = 0,\\
\frac{\partial v_x}{\partial x} + \frac{\partial v_y}{\partial y} + \frac{\partial v_z}{\partial z} &= 0,\\
\end{align}$$

where $\mu$ is the viscosity. These equations are similar to boundary layer equations, except that there are no non-linear terms. In the first approximation, we then have, after imposing the non-slip boundary conditions at $z=0,h$,

$$\begin{align} p &= p(x,y), \\
v_x &=-\frac{1}{2\mu}\frac{\partial p}{\partial x} z(h-z),\\
v_y &=-\frac{1}{2\mu}\frac{\partial p}{\partial y} z(h-z)
\end{align}$$

The equation for $p$ is obtained from the continuity equation. Integrating the continuity equation from across the channel and imposing no-penetration boundary conditions at the walls, we have

$$\int_0^h\left(\frac{\partial v_x}{\partial x} + \frac{\partial v_y}{\partial y}\right)dz=0,$$

which leads to the Laplace Equation:

$$\frac{\partial^2 p}{\partial x^2}+\frac{\partial^2 p}{\partial y^2}=0.$$

This equation is supplemented by appropriate boundary conditions. For example, no-penetration boundary conditions on the side walls become: ${\mathbf \nabla} p \cdot \mathbf n= 0$, where $\mathbf n$ is a unit vector perpendicular to the side wall (note that on the side walls, non-slip boundary conditions cannot be imposed). The boundaries may also be regions exposed to constant pressure in which case a Dirichlet boundary condition for $p$ is appropriate. Similarly, periodic boundary conditions can also be used. It can also be noted that the vertical velocity component in the first approximation is

$$v_z=0$$

that follows from the continuity equation. While the velocity magnitude $\sqrt{v_x^2+v_y^2}$ varies in the $z$ direction, the velocity-vector direction $\tan^{-1}(v_y/v_x)$ is independent of $z$ direction, that is to say, streamline patterns at each level are similar. The vorticity vector $\boldsymbol\omega$ has the components

$$\omega_x = \frac{1}{2\mu}\frac{\partial p}{\partial y}(h-2z), \quad \omega_y = -\frac{1}{2\mu}\frac{\partial p}{\partial x}(h-2z), \quad  \omega_z=0.$$

Since $\omega_z=0$, the streamline patterns in the $xy$-plane thus correspond to potential flow (irrotational flow). Unlike potential flow, here the circulation $\Gamma$ around any closed contour $C$ (parallel to the $xy$-plane), whether it encloses a solid object or not, is zero,

$$\Gamma = \oint_C v_xdx+v_ydy = -\frac{1}{2\mu} z(h-z) \oint_C \left(\frac{\partial p}{\partial x}dx + \frac{\partial p}{\partial y} dy\right) =0$$

where the last integral is set to zero because $p$ is a single-valued function and the integration is done over a closed contour.

=== Depth-averaged form ===
In a Hele-Shaw channel, one can define the depth-averaged version of any physical quantity, say $\varphi$ by

$$\langle\varphi\rangle \equiv \frac{1}{h}\int_0^h \varphi dz.$$

Then the two-dimensional depth-averaged velocity vector $\mathbf u \equiv \langle \mathbf v_{xy} \rangle$, where $\mathbf v_{xy}=(v_x,v_y)$, satisfies the Darcy's law,

$$-\frac{12\mu}{h^2}\mathbf u = \nabla p \quad \text{with} \quad \nabla\cdot\mathbf u=0.$$

Further, $\langle\boldsymbol\omega\rangle =0.$

== Hele-Shaw cell ==
The term Hele-Shaw cell is commonly used for cases in which a fluid is injected into the shallow geometry from above or below the geometry, and when the fluid is bounded by another liquid or gas. For such flows the boundary conditions are defined by pressures and surface tensions.

== See also ==
- Diffusion-limited aggregation
- Lubrication theory
- Thin-film equation
- Hele-Shaw clutch
- Ostroumov flow
