= Hilding Faxén =

Swedish physicist

Olov Hilding Faxén (29 March 1892 – 1 June 1970) was a Swedish physicist who was primarily active within mechanics.

Faxén received his doctorate in 1921 at Uppsala University with the thesis Einwirkung der Gefässwände auf den Widerstand gegen die Bewegung einer kleinen Kugel in einer zähen Flüssigkeit ("Influence of the container walls on the resistance against movement by a small ball in a viscous fluid"). One of his contributions was to formulate Faxén's law, which is a correction to Stokes' law for the friction on spherical objects in a viscous fluid, valid in the case when the object moves close to a wall of the container. This was a problem previously treated by Carl Wilhelm Oseen (1910) and Horace Lamb (1911), but incompletely solved.

After the death of Ivar Fredholm, Faxén temporarily upheld the chair in mathematical physics at Stockholm University College, before Oskar Klein was made the new professor. Faxén then served as professor at Chalmers Institute of Technology, first in mathematics from 1930 and then in mechanics and mathematics 1934–1935. In 1935, Faxén was appointed professor of mechanics at the Royal Institute of Technology in Stockholm, where he remained until his retirement in 1958.

Together with the Norwegian physicist Johan Holtsmark, Faxén published a work in 1927 about scattering of electrons in gases. Here they introduced a new, mathematical method based upon partial waves. This is now standard and described in almost every modern book on quantum mechanics.

In 1948, Faxén was elected a member of the Royal Swedish Academy of Sciences.

== See also ==
- Faxén integral
