= Basset–Boussinesq–Oseen equation =

Equation describing particle motion in unsteady, low-Reynolds fluid flow

In fluid dynamics, the Basset–Boussinesq–Oseen equation (BBO equation) describes the motion of – and forces on – a small particle in unsteady flow at low Reynolds numbers. The equation is named after Joseph Valentin Boussinesq, Alfred Barnard Basset and Carl Wilhelm Oseen.

== Formulation ==
The BBO equation, in the formulation as given by Zhu & Fan (1998, pp. 18–27) and Soo (1990), pertains to a small spherical particle of diameter $d_p$ having mean density $\rho_p$ whose center is located at $\boldsymbol{X}_p(t)$. The particle moves with Lagrangian velocity $\boldsymbol{U}_p(t)=\text{d} \boldsymbol{X}_p / \text{d}t$ in a fluid of density $\rho_f$, dynamic viscosity $\mu$ and Eulerian velocity field $\boldsymbol{u}_f(\boldsymbol{x},t)$. The fluid velocity field surrounding the particle consists of the undisturbed, local Eulerian velocity field $\boldsymbol{u}_f$ plus a disturbance field – created by the presence of the particle and its motion with respect to the undisturbed field $\boldsymbol{u}_f.$ For very small particle diameter the latter is locally a constant whose value is given by the undisturbed Eulerian field evaluated at the location of the particle center, $\boldsymbol{U}_f(t)=\boldsymbol{u}_f(\boldsymbol{X}_p(t),t)$. The small particle size also implies that the disturbed flow can be found in the limit of very small Reynolds number, leading to a drag force given by Stokes' drag. Unsteadiness of the flow relative to the particle results in force contributions by added mass and the Basset force. The BBO equation states:

$$\begin{align}
\frac{\pi}{6} \rho_p d_p^3 \frac{\text{d} \boldsymbol{U}_p}{\text{d} t}
&= \underbrace{3 \pi \mu d_p \left( \boldsymbol{U}_f - \boldsymbol{U}_p \right)}_{\text{term 1}}
- \underbrace{\frac{\pi}{6} d_p^3 \boldsymbol{\nabla} p}_{\text{term 2}}
+ \underbrace{\frac{\pi}{12} \rho_f d_p^3\,
\frac{\text{d}}{\text{d} t} \left( \boldsymbol{U}_f - \boldsymbol{U}_p \right)}_{\text{term 3}}
\\ &
+ \underbrace{\frac{3}{2} d_p^2 \sqrt{\pi \rho_f \mu}
\int_{t_{_0}}^t \frac{1}{\sqrt{t-\tau}}\, \frac{\text{d}}{\text{d} \tau} \left( \boldsymbol{U}_f - \boldsymbol{U}_p \right)\,
\text{d} \tau}_{\text{term 4}}
+ \underbrace{\sum_k \boldsymbol{F}_k}_{\text{term 5}} .
\end{align}$$

This is Newton's second law, in which the left-hand side is the rate of change of the particle's linear momentum, and the right-hand side is the summation of forces acting on the particle. The terms on the right-hand side are, respectively, the:

1. Stokes' drag,
2. Froude–Krylov force due to the pressure gradient in the undisturbed flow, with $\boldsymbol{\nabla}$ the gradient operator and $p(\boldsymbol{x},t)$ the undisturbed pressure field,
3. added mass,
4. Basset force and
5. other forces acting on the particle, such as gravity, etc.

The particle Reynolds number $R_e:$

$$R_e = \frac{\max\left\{ \left| \boldsymbol{U}_p - \boldsymbol{U}_f \right| \right\}\, d_p}{\mu/\rho_f}$$

has to be less than unity, $R_e < 1$, for the BBO equation to give an adequate representation of the forces on the particle.

Also Zhu & Fan (1998, pp. 18–27) suggest to estimate the pressure gradient from the Navier–Stokes equations:

$$-\boldsymbol{\nabla} p
= \rho_f \frac{\text{D} \boldsymbol{u}_f}{\text{D} t}
- \mu \nabla^2 \boldsymbol{u}_f,$$

with $\text{D} \boldsymbol{u}_f / \text{D} t$ the material derivative of $\boldsymbol{u}_f.$ Note that in the Navier–Stokes equations $\boldsymbol{u}_f(\boldsymbol{x},t)$ is the fluid velocity field, while, as indicated above, in the BBO equation $\boldsymbol{U}_f$ is the velocity of the undisturbed flow as seen by an observer moving with the particle. Thus, even in steady Eulerian flow $\boldsymbol{u}_f$ depends on time if the Eulerian field is non-uniform.
