= Tension (physics) =

Pulling force transmitted axially

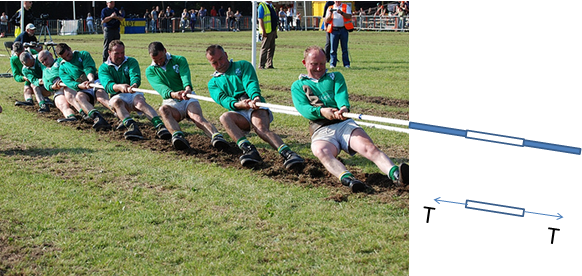
Nine men pull on a rope. The rope in the photo extends into a drawn illustration showing adjacent segments of the rope. One segment is duplicated in a free body diagram showing a pair of action-reaction forces of magnitude T pulling the segment in opposite directions, where T is transmitted axially and is called the tension force. This end of the rope is pulling the tug of war team to the right. Each segment of the rope is pulled by the two neighboring segments, stressing the segment in what is also called tension.

Tension is the pulling or stretching force transmitted axially along an object such as a string, rope, chain, rod, truss member, or other object, so as to stretch or pull apart the object. In terms of force, it is the opposite of compression. Tension might also be described as the action-reaction pair of forces acting at each end of an object.

At the atomic level, when atoms or molecules are pulled apart from each other and gain potential energy with a restoring force still existing, the restoring force might create what is also called tension. Each end of a string or rod under such tension could pull on the object it is attached to, in order to restore the string/rod to its relaxed length.

Tension (as a transmitted force, as an action-reaction pair of forces, or as a restoring force) is measured in newtons in the International System of Units (or pounds-force in Imperial units). The ends of a string or other object transmitting tension will exert forces on the objects to which the string or rod is connected, in the direction of the string at the point of attachment. These forces due to tension are also called "passive forces". There are two basic possibilities for systems of objects held by strings: either acceleration is zero and the system is therefore in equilibrium, or there is acceleration, and therefore a net force is present in the system. The C.G.S unit of Surface tension is dynespercentimeters.

== Tension in one dimension ==
The tension in a tetherball rope

Tension in a string is a non-negative vector quantity. Zero tension is slack. A string or rope is often idealized as one dimension, having fixed length but being massless with zero cross section. If there are no bends in the string, as occur with vibrations or pulleys, then tension is a constant along the string, equal to the magnitude of the forces applied by the ends of the string. By Newton's third law, these are the same forces exerted on the ends of the string by the objects to which the ends are attached. If the string curves around one or more pulleys, it will still have constant tension along its length in the idealized situation that the pulleys are massless and frictionless. A vibrating string vibrates with a set of frequencies that depend on the string's tension. These frequencies can be derived from Newton's laws of motion. Each microscopic segment of the string pulls on and is pulled upon by its neighboring segments, with a force equal to the tension at that position along the string.

If the string has curvature, then the two pulls on a segment by its two neighbors will not add to zero, and there will be a net force on that segment of the string, causing an acceleration. This net force is a restoring force, and the motion of the string can include transverse waves that solve the equation central to Sturm–Liouville theory:
$$-\frac{\mathrm{d}}{\mathrm{d}x} \bigg[ \tau(x) \frac{\mathrm{d}\rho(x)}{\mathrm{d}x} \bigg]+v(x)\rho(x) = \omega^2\sigma(x)\rho(x)$$
where $v(x)$ is the force constant per unit length [units force per area] and $\omega^2$ are the eigenvalues for resonances of transverse displacement $\rho(x)$ on the string, with solutions that include the various harmonics on a stringed instrument.

== Tension of three dimensions ==
Tension is also used to describe the force exerted by the ends of a three-dimensional, continuous material such as a rod or truss member. In this context, tension is analogous to negative pressure. A rod under tension elongates. The amount of elongation and the load that will cause failure both depend on the force per cross-sectional area rather than the force alone, so stress = axial force / cross sectional area is more useful for engineering purposes than tension. Stress is a 3x3 matrix called a tensor, and the $\sigma_{11}$ element of the stress tensor is tensile force per area, or compression force per area, denoted as a negative number for this element, if the rod is being compressed rather than elongated.

Thus, one can obtain a scalar analogous to tension by taking the trace of the stress tensor.

== System in equilibrium ==
A system is in equilibrium when the sum of all forces is zero.
$$\sum \vec{F} = 0$$

For example, consider a system consisting of an object that is being lowered vertically by a string with tension, T, at a constant velocity. The system has a constant velocity and is therefore in equilibrium because the tension in the string, which is pulling up on the object, is equal to the weight force, mg ("m" is mass, "g" is the acceleration caused by the gravity of Earth), which is pulling down on the object.
$$\sum \vec{F} = \vec{T} - m\vec{g} = 0$$

== System under net force ==
A system has a net force when an unbalanced force is exerted on it, in other words the sum of all forces is not zero. Acceleration and net force always exist together.
$$\sum \vec{F} \ne 0$$

For example, consider the same system as above but suppose the object is now being lowered with an increasing velocity downwards (positive acceleration) therefore there exists a net force somewhere in the system. In this case, negative acceleration would indicate that $|mg| > |T|$.
$$\sum \vec{F} = \vec{T} - m\vec{g} \ne 0$$

In another example, suppose that two bodies A and B having masses $m_1$ and $m_2$, respectively, are connected with each other by an inextensible string over a frictionless pulley. There are two forces acting on the body A: its weight ($w_1=m_1g$) pulling down, and the tension $T$ in the string pulling up. Therefore, the net force $F_1$ on body A is $w_1-T$, so $m_1a=m_1g-T$. In an extensible string, Hooke's law applies.

== See also ==
- Continuum mechanics
- Fall factor
- Surface tension
- Tensile strength
- Traction (mechanics)
- Hydrostatic pressure
