= Basset force =

In a body submerged in a fluid, unsteady forces due to acceleration of that body with respect to the fluid, can be divided into two parts: the virtual mass effect and the Basset force.

The Basset force term describes the force due to the lagging boundary layer development with changing relative velocity (acceleration) of bodies moving through a fluid. The Basset term accounts for viscous effects and addresses the temporal delay in boundary layer development as the relative velocity changes with time. It is also known as the "history" term. The Basset force is difficult to implement and is commonly neglected for practical reasons; however, it can be substantially large when the body is accelerated at a high rate.

This force in an accelerating Stokes flow has been proposed by Joseph Valentin Boussinesq in 1885 and Alfred Barnard Basset in 1888. Consequently, it is also referred to as the Boussinesq–Basset force.

== Acceleration of a flat plate ==
Consider an infinitely large plate started impulsively with a step change in velocity—from 0 to u_{0}—in a direction parallel to the plate–fluid interface plane.

The equation of motion for the fluid—Stokes flow at low Reynolds number—is

$$\frac{\partial u}{\partial t}=\nu_c\,\frac{\partial^2u}{\partial y^2},$$

where u(y,t) is the velocity of the fluid, at some time t, parallel to the plate, at a distance y from the plate, and v_{c} is the kinematic viscosity of the fluid (c~continuous phase). The solution to this equation is,

$$u=u_0 - u_0\, \operatorname{erf}\left(\frac{y}{2\sqrt{\nu_ct}}\right) = u_0 \operatorname{erfc}\left(\frac{y}{2\sqrt{\nu_ct}}\right),$$

where erf and erfc denote the error function and the complementary error function, respectively.

Assuming that an acceleration of the plate can be broken up into a series of such step changes in the velocity, it can be shown that the cumulative effect on the shear stress on the plate is

$$\tau=\sqrt{\frac{\rho_c\mu_c}{\pi}}\int\limits_0^t\frac{\frac{\partial u_p}{\partial t'}}{\sqrt{t-t'}} \, dt',$$

where u_{p}(t) is the velocity of the plate, ρ_{c} is the mass density of the fluid, and μ_{c} is the viscosity of the fluid.

== Acceleration of a spherical particle ==
Boussinesq (1885) and Basset (1888) found that the force F on an accelerating spherical particle in a viscous fluid is

$$\mathbf{F}=\frac{3}{2}D^2\sqrt{\pi\rho_c\mu_c}\int\limits_0^t\frac{\mathbf{v}\cdot\mathbf{\nabla}\mathbf{u}+\frac{\partial \mathbf{u}}{\partial t'}-\frac{\partial\mathbf{v}}{\partial t'}}{\sqrt{t-t'}}dt',$$

where D is the particle diameter, and u and v are the fluid and particle velocity vectors, respectively.

== See also ==
- Basset–Boussinesq–Oseen equation
- Stokes boundary layer
