= Alfred Barnard Basset =

British mathematician (1854–1930)

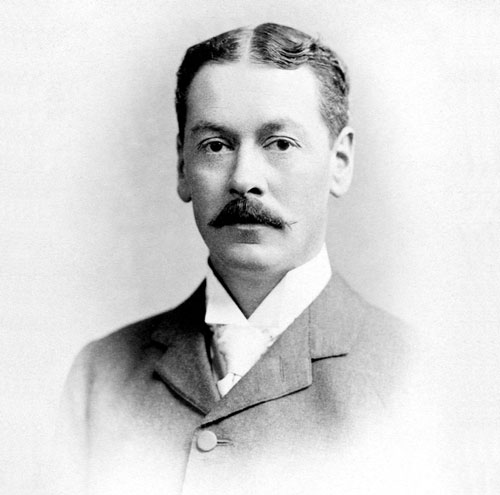
- Born: 25 July 1854; London
- Died: 5 December 1930 (aged 76)
- Education: Cambridge University
- Known for: Basset force Basset–Boussinesq–Oseen equation Basset integral
- Scientific career
- Fields: Mathematics; Physics

Alfred Barnard Basset FRS (25 July 1854 – 5 December 1930) was a British mathematician working on algebraic geometry, electrodynamics and hydrodynamics. In fluid dynamics, the Basset force—also known as the Boussinesq–Basset force—describes history effects on the force experienced by a body in unsteady motion (relative to a viscous fluid). He also worked on Bessel functions: the term Basset function was at one time used for modified Bessel functions of the second kind but is now obsolete.

== Biography ==
Basset graduated B.A. from Trinity college, Cambridge in 1877 as 13th wrangler and finished his M.A. in 1881. He started his career in law, but soon abandoned it to continue his mathematical research. He was elected a fellow of the Royal Society in 1889.

== Books ==
- Alfred B. Basset (1888). A treatise on hydrodynamics: with numerous examples, Vol. 1. Deighton, Bell and Company.
- Alfred B. Basset (1888). A treatise on hydrodynamics: with numerous examples, Vol. 2. Deighton, Bell and Company.
- Alfred B. Basset (1890). An elementary treatise on hydrodynamics and sound. Deighton, Bell and Company.
- Alfred B. Basset (1892). A treatise on physical optics. Deighton, Bell and Company.
- Alfred B. Basset (1901). An elementary treatise on cubic and quartic curves. Deighton, Bell and Company.
- Alfred B. Basset (1910). A treatise on the geometry of surfaces. Deighton, Bell and Company.
