= Darwin drift =

Darwin drift – at the end of the animation – due to the passage of a rigid sphere, according to potential flow theory. The dark blue line is a timeline: a line of fluid parcels followed in time and deformed by the passage of the sphere. The timeline passes through the symmetry axis of the flow. The orange dots are drifters connected by a pathline, i.e. the path that individual fluid parcels follow when the sphere passes by. Note that fluid parcels may also move upward during the passage of the body. A larger version of this animation can be found here (15 MB), showing e.g. streamlines.

In fluid dynamics, Darwin drift refers to the phenomenon that a fluid parcel is permanently displaced after the passage of a body through a fluid – the fluid being at rest far away from the body.

Consider a plane of fluid parcels perpendicular to the direction of the body's constant velocity vector, far before the passage of the body. During the passage of the body the fluid parcels move, according to their Lagrangian motion. Far after the passage of the body, the fluid parcels are permanently displaced. The volume between the initial plane of the fluid parcels and the surface consisting of the parcel positions long after the body's passage is called the Darwin drift volume.

The phenomenon is named after Sir Charles Galton Darwin, who proved in 1953 that the drift volume multiplied with the fluid density equals the added mass of the body, – known as Darwin's theorem.

As shown by Eames and McIntyre in 1999, Darwin drift (by the passage of a body through a fluid otherwise at rest) and Stokes drift (in the fluid motion associated with surface waves) are closely related.

== Notes ==
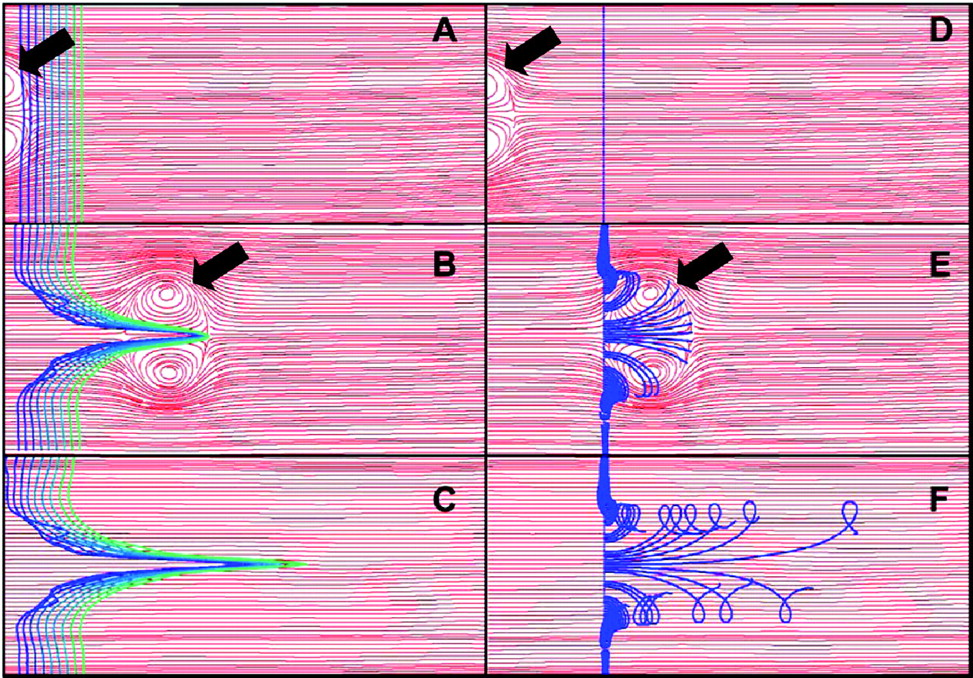
Darwin drift (A, B & C) and particle pathlines (D, E & F) as derived from PIV measurements on the passage of a pair of vortices. This image is from Dabiri (2005), figure 6.
