= Drag (physics) =

Retarding force on a body moving in a fluid

Drag is the component that is parallel to the flow direction, and lift is defined as the component of the aerodynamic force that is perpendicular to the flow direction.

In fluid dynamics, drag, sometimes referred to as fluid resistance, and also known as viscous force, is a force acting opposite to the direction of motion of any object moving with respect to a surrounding fluid. This can exist between two fluid layers, or between a fluid and a solid surface. Drag forces tend to decrease fluid velocity relative to the solid object in the fluid's path.

Unlike other resistive forces, drag force depends on velocity. Drag force is proportional to the relative velocity for low-speed flow and is proportional to the velocity squared for high-speed flow. This distinction between low and high-speed flow is measured by the Reynolds number.

== Examples ==
Examples of drag include:

- Net aerodynamic or hydrodynamic force: Drag acting opposite to the direction of movement of a solid object such as cars, aircraft, and boat hulls.
- Viscous drag of fluid in a pipe: Drag force on the immobile pipe restricts the velocity of the fluid through the pipe.
- In the physics of sports, drag force is necessary to explain the motion of balls, javelins, arrows, and frisbees and the performance of runners and swimmers. For a top sprinter, overcoming drag can require 5% of their energy output.

== Types ==
There are many distinct types of drag caused by different physical interactions between the object and fluid. Two types of drag are relevant for all objects:

- Form drag, which is caused by the pressure exerted on the object as the fluid flow goes around the object. Form drag is determined by the cross-sectional shape and area of the body.
- Skin friction drag (or viscous drag), which is caused by friction between the fluid and the surface of the object. The surface may be the outside of an object, such as a boat hull, or the inside of an object, such as the bore of a pipe.

There are two types of which are primarily relevant for aircraft:

- Lift-induced drag appears with wings or a lifting body in aviation and with semi-planing or planing hulls for watercraft
- Wave drag (aerodynamics) is caused by the presence of shockwaves and first appears at subsonic aircraft speeds when local flow velocities become supersonic. The wave drag of the supersonic Concorde prototype aircraft was reduced at Mach 2 by 1.8% by applying the area rule which extended the rear fuselage 3.73 m (12.2 ft) on the production aircraft.

Wave resistance affects watercraft:

- Wave resistance (ship hydrodynamics) occurs when a solid object is moving along a fluid boundary and making surface waves.

Last, in aerodynamics the term "parasitic drag" is often used. Parasitic drag is the sum of form drag and skin friction drag and is entirely negative to an aircraft, in contrast with lift-induced drag which is a consequence of generating lift.

=== Comparison of form drag and skin friction ===
Shape and flow	Form Drag	Skin friction
	≈0%	≈100%
	≈10%	≈90%
	≈90%	≈10%
	≈100%	≈0%

The effect of streamlining on the relative proportions of skin friction and form drag is shown in the table at right for an airfoil, which is a streamlined body, and a cylinder, which is a bluff body. Also shown is a flat plate in two different orientations, illustrating the effect of orientation on the relative proportions of skin friction and form drag, and showing the pressure difference between front and back.

A body is known as bluff or blunt when the source of drag is dominated by pressure forces, and streamlined if the drag is dominated by viscous forces. For example, road vehicles are bluff bodies. For aircraft, pressure and friction drag are included in the definition of parasitic drag. Parasite drag is often expressed in terms of a hypothetical.

=== Lift-induced drag ===
Lift-induced drag (also called induced drag) is drag which occurs as the result of the creation of lift on a three-dimensional lifting body, such as the wing or propeller of an airplane. Induced drag consists primarily of two components: drag due to the creation of trailing vortices (vortex drag); and the presence of additional viscous drag (lift-induced viscous drag) that is not present when lift is zero. The trailing vortices in the flow-field, present in the wake of a lifting body, derive from the turbulent mixing of air from above and below the body which flows in slightly different directions as a consequence of creation of lift.

With other parameters remaining the same, as the lift generated by a body increases, so does the lift-induced drag. This means that as the wing's angle of attack increases (up to a maximum called the stalling angle), the lift coefficient also increases, and so too does the lift-induced drag. At the onset of stall, lift is abruptly decreased, as is lift-induced drag, but viscous pressure drag, a component of parasite drag, increases due to the formation of turbulent unattached flow in the wake behind the body.

=== Parasitic drag ===
Parasitic drag, or profile drag, is the sum of viscous pressure drag (form drag) and drag due to surface roughness (skin friction drag). Additionally, the presence of multiple bodies in relative proximity may incur so called interference drag, which is sometimes described as a component of parasitic drag. In aeronautics the parasitic drag and lift-induced drag are often given separately.

For an aircraft at low speed, induced drag tends to be relatively greater than parasitic drag because a high angle of attack is required to maintain lift, increasing induced drag. As speed increases, the angle of attack is reduced and the induced drag decreases. Parasitic drag, however, increases because the fluid is flowing more quickly around protruding objects increasing friction or drag. At even higher speeds (transonic), wave drag enters the picture. Each of these forms of drag changes in proportion to the others based on speed. The combined overall drag curve therefore shows a minimum at some airspeed - an aircraft flying at this speed will be at or close to its optimal efficiency. Pilots will use this speed to maximize endurance (minimum fuel consumption), or maximize gliding range in the event of an engine failure.

The equivalent parasite area is the area which a flat plate perpendicular to the flow would have to match the parasite drag of an aircraft. It is a measure used when comparing the drag of different aircraft. For example, the Douglas DC-3 has an equivalent parasite area of 2.20 m^{2} (23.7 ft^{2}) and the McDonnell Douglas DC-9, with 30 years of advancement in aircraft design, an area of 1.91 m^{2} (20.6 ft^{2}) although it carried five times as many passengers.

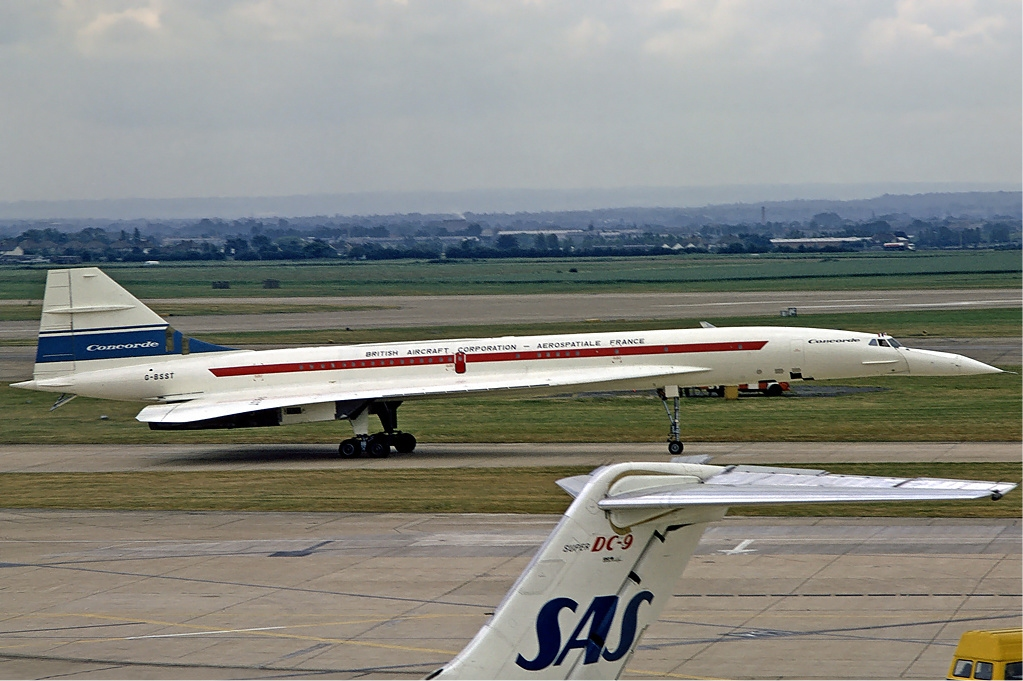
Concorde with short tail spike.

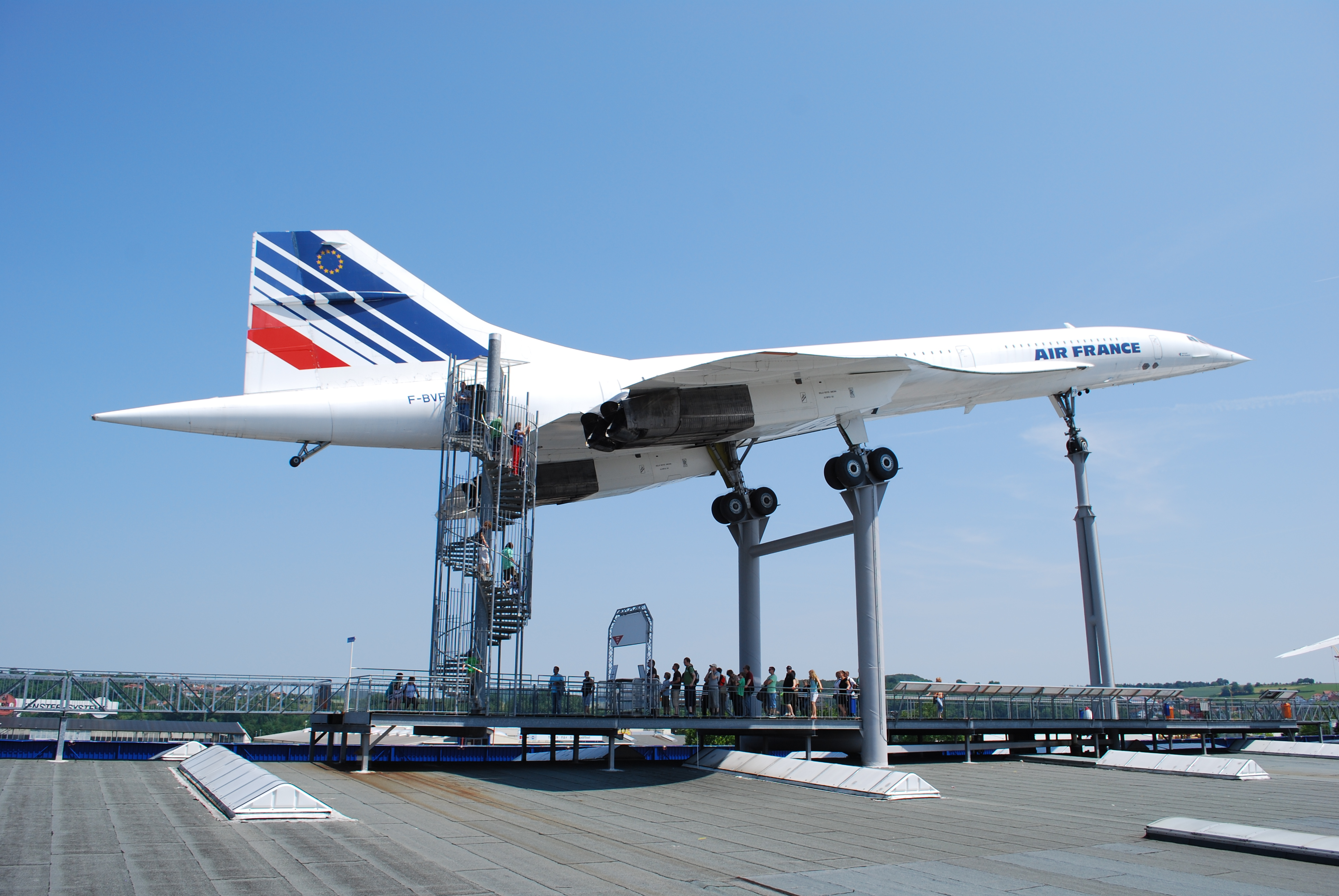
Concorde with longer tail spike which gave lower wave drag.

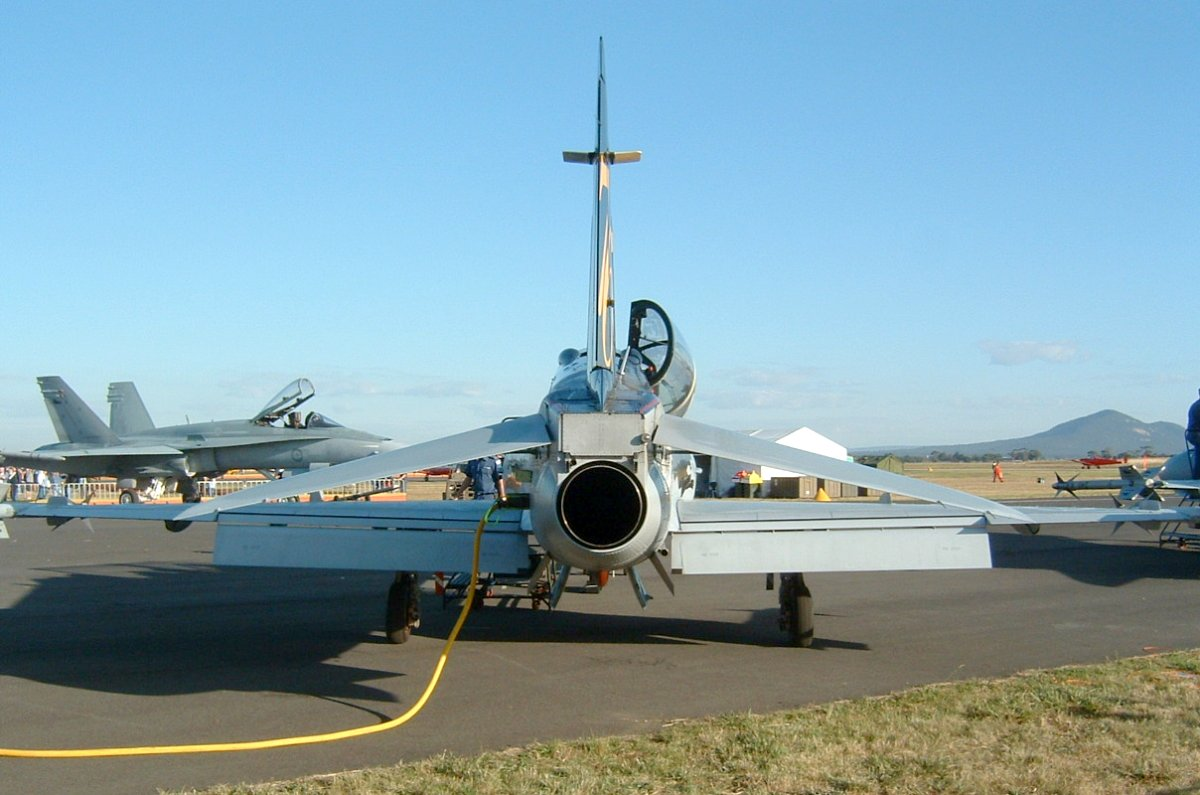
Hawk aircraft showing base area above circular engine exhaust

== The drag equation ==
Drag coefficient C_{d} for a sphere as a function of Reynolds number Re, as obtained from laboratory experiments. The dark line is for a sphere with a smooth surface, while the lighter line is for the case of a rough surface.

Drag depends on the properties of the fluid and on the size, shape, and speed of the object. One way to express this is by means of the drag equation:
$$F_{\mathrm D}\, =\, \tfrac12\, \rho\, v^2\, C_{\mathrm D }\, A$$
where

- $F_{\rm D}$ is the drag force,
- $\rho$ is the density of the fluid,
- $v$ is the speed of the object relative to the fluid,
- $C_{\rm D}$ is the drag coefficient – a dimensionless number,
- $A$ is the cross sectional area.

The drag coefficient depends on the shape of the object and on the Reynolds number
$$\mathrm{Re}=\frac{vD}{\nu} = \frac{\rho vD}{\mu},$$
where

- $D$ is some characteristic diameter or linear dimension. Actually, $D$ is the equivalent diameter $D_{e}$ of the object. For a sphere, $D_{e}$ is the D of the sphere itself.
- For a rectangular shape cross-section in the motion direction, $D_{e} = 1.30 \cdot \frac{(a \cdot b)^{0.625}} {(a+b)^{0.25}}$, where a and b are the rectangle edges.
- ${\nu}$ is the kinematic viscosity of the fluid (equal to the dynamic viscosity ${\mu}$ divided by the density ${\rho}$ ).

At low $\mathrm{Re}$, $C_{\rm D}$ is asymptotically proportional to $\mathrm{Re}^{-1}$, which means that the drag is linearly proportional to the speed, i.e. the drag force on a small sphere moving through a viscous fluid is given by Stokes' Law:
$$F_{\rm d} = 3 \pi \mu D v$$
At high $\mathrm{Re}$, $C_{\rm D}$ is more or less constant, but drag will vary as the square of the speed varies. The graph to the right shows how $C_{\rm D}$ varies with $\mathrm{Re}$ for the case of a sphere. Since the power needed to overcome the drag force is the product of the force times speed, the power needed to overcome drag will vary as the square of the speed at low Reynolds numbers, and as the cube of the speed at high numbers.

It can be demonstrated that drag force can be expressed as a function of a dimensionless number, which is dimensionally identical to the Bejan number. Consequently, drag force and drag coefficient can be a function of Bejan number. In fact, from the expression of drag force it has been obtained:
$$F_{\rm d} = \Delta_{\rm p} A_{\rm w} = \frac{1}{2} C_{\rm D} A_{\rm f} \frac {\nu \mu}{l^2}\mathrm{Re}_L^2$$
and consequently allows expressing the drag coefficient $C_{\rm D}$ as a function of Bejan number and the ratio between wet area $A_{\rm w}$ and front area $A_{\rm f}$:
$$C_{\rm D} = 2\frac{A_{\rm w}}{A_{\rm f}}\frac{\mathrm{Be}}{\mathrm{Re}_L^2}$$
where $\mathrm{Re}_L$ is the Reynolds number related to fluid path length L.

== At high velocity ==
Explanation of drag by NASA.

As mentioned, the drag equation with a constant drag coefficient gives the force moving through a fluid at a relatively large velocity, i.e. high Reynolds number, Re > ~1000. This is also called quadratic drag.

$$F_D\, =\, \tfrac12\, \rho\, v^2\, C_D\, A,$$
The derivation of this equation is presented at Drag equation § Derivation.

The reference area A is often the orthographic projection of the object, or the frontal area, on a plane perpendicular to the direction of motion. For objects with a simple shape, such as a sphere, this is the cross sectional area. Sometimes a body is a composite of different parts, each with a different reference area (drag coefficient corresponding to each of those different areas must be determined).

In the case of a wing, the reference areas are the same, and the drag force is in the same ratio as the lift force. Therefore, the reference for a wing is often the lifting area, sometimes referred to as "wing area" rather than the frontal area.

For an object with a smooth surface, and non-fixed separation points (like a sphere or circular cylinder), the drag coefficient may vary with Reynolds number Re, up to extremely high values (Re of the order 10^{7}).

For an object with well-defined fixed separation points, like a circular disk with its plane normal to the flow direction, the drag coefficient is constant for Re > 3,500. The further the drag coefficient C_{d} is, in general, a function of the orientation of the flow with respect to the object (apart from symmetrical objects like a sphere).

=== Power ===
Under the assumption that the fluid is not moving relative to the currently used reference system, the power required to overcome the aerodynamic drag is given by:
$$P_D = \mathbf{F}_D \cdot \mathbf{v} = \tfrac12 \rho v^3 A C_D$$
The power needed to push an object through a fluid increases as the cube of the velocity increases. For example, a car cruising on a highway at 50 mph (80 km/h) may require only 10 horsepower (7.5 kW) to overcome aerodynamic drag, but that same car at 100 mph (160 km/h) requires 80 hp (60 kW). With a doubling of speeds, the drag/force quadruples per the formula. Exerting 4 times the force over a fixed distance produces 4 times as much work. At twice the speed, the work (resulting in displacement over a fixed distance) is done twice as fast. Since power is the rate of doing work, 4 times the work done in half the time requires 8 times the power.

When the fluid is moving relative to the reference system, for example, a car driving into headwind, the power required to overcome the aerodynamic drag is given by the following formula:
$$P_D = \mathbf{F}_D \cdot \mathbf{v_o} = \tfrac12 C_D A \rho (v_w + v_o)^2 v_o$$

Where $v_w$ is the wind speed and $v_o$ is the object speed (both relative to ground).

=== Velocity of a falling object ===
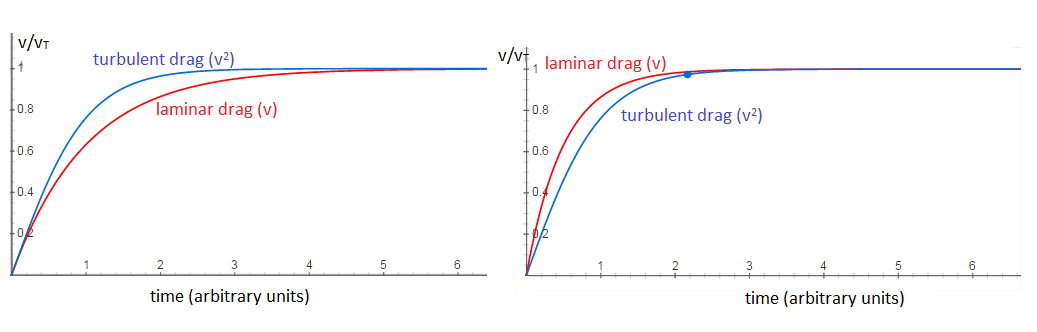
An object falling through viscous medium accelerates quickly towards its terminal speed, approaching gradually as the speed gets nearer to the terminal speed. Whether the object experiences turbulent or laminar drag changes the characteristic shape of the graph with turbulent flow resulting in a constant acceleration for a larger fraction of its accelerating time.

Velocity as a function of time for an object falling through a non-dense medium, and released at zero relative-velocity v = 0 at time t = 0, is roughly given by a function involving a hyperbolic tangent (tanh):
$$v(t) = \sqrt{ \frac{2mg}{\rho A C_D} } \tanh \left(t \sqrt{\frac{g \rho C_D A}{2 m}} \right). \,$$

The hyperbolic tangent has a limit value of one, for large time t. In other words, velocity asymptotically approaches a maximum value called the terminal velocity v_{t}:
$$v_{t} = \sqrt{ \frac{2mg}{\rho A C_D} }. \,$$

For an object falling and released at relative-velocity v = v_{i} at time t = 0, with v_{i} < v_{t}, is also defined in terms of the hyperbolic tangent function:
$$v(t) = v_t \tanh \left( t \frac{ g }{ v_t } + \operatorname{arctanh}\left( \frac{ v_i}{ v_t} \right) \right). \,$$

For v_{i} > v_{t}, the velocity function is defined in terms of the hyperbolic cotangent function:
$$v(t) = v_t \coth \left( t \frac{ g }{ v_t } + \coth^{-1}\left( \frac{ v_i}{ v_t} \right) \right). \,$$

The hyperbolic cotangent also has a limit value of one, for large time t. Velocity asymptotically tends to the terminal velocity v_{t}, strictly from above v_{t}.

For v_{i} = v_{t}, the velocity is constant:
$$v(t) = v_t.$$

These functions are defined by the solution of the following differential equation:
$$g - \frac{\rho A C_D}{2m} v^2 = \frac{dv}{dt}. \,$$

Or, more generically (where F(v) are the forces acting on the object beyond drag):
$$\frac{1}{m}\sum F(v) - \frac{\rho A C_D}{2m} v^2 = \frac{dv}{dt}. \,$$

For a potato-shaped object of average diameter d and of density ρ_{obj}, terminal velocity is about
$$v_{t} = \sqrt{ gd \frac{ \rho_{obj} }{\rho} }. \,$$

For objects of water-like density (raindrops, hail, live objects—mammals, birds, insects, etc.) falling in air near Earth's surface at sea level, the terminal velocity is roughly equal to
$$v_{t} = 90 \sqrt{ d }, \,$$
with d in metres and v_{t} in m/s. For example, for a human body ($d$ ≈0.6 m) $v_t$ ≈70 m/s, for a small animal like a cat ($d$ ≈0.2 m) $v_t$ ≈40 m/s, for a small bird ($d$ ≈0.05 m) $v_t$ ≈20 m/s, for an insect ($d$ ≈0.01 m) $v_t$ ≈9 m/s, and so on. Terminal velocity for very small objects (pollen, etc.) at low Reynolds numbers is determined by Stokes law.

In short, terminal velocity is higher for larger creatures, and thus potentially more deadly. A creature such as a mouse falling at its terminal velocity is much more likely to survive impact with the ground than a human falling at its terminal velocity.

== Low Reynolds numbers: Stokes' drag ==
Trajectories of three objects thrown at the same angle (70°). The black object does not experience any form of drag and moves along a parabola. The blue object experiences Stokes' drag, and the green object Newton drag.

The equation for viscous resistance or linear drag is appropriate for objects or particles moving through a fluid at relatively slow speeds (assuming there is no turbulence). Purely laminar flow only exists up to Re = 0.1 under this definition. In this case, the force of drag is approximately proportional to velocity. The equation for viscous resistance is:

$$\mathbf{F}_D = - b \mathbf{v} \,$$

where:

- $b$ is a constant that depends on both the material properties of the object and fluid, as well as the geometry of the object; and
- $\mathbf{v}$ is the velocity of the object.

When an object falls from rest, its velocity will be
$$v(t) = \frac{(\rho-\rho_0)\,V\,g}{b}\left(1-e^{-b\,t/m}\right)$$
where:

- $\rho$ is the density of the object,
- $\rho_0$ is density of the fluid,
- $V$ is the volume of the object,
- $g$ is the acceleration due to gravity (i.e., 9.8 m/s$^2$), and
- $m$ is mass of the object.

The velocity asymptotically approaches the terminal velocity $v_t = \frac{(\rho-\rho_0)Vg}{b}$. For a given $b$, denser objects fall more quickly.

For the special case of small spherical objects moving slowly through a viscous fluid (and thus at small Reynolds number), George Gabriel Stokes derived an expression for the drag constant:
$$b = 6 \pi \eta r\,$$
where $r$ is the Stokes radius of the particle, and $\eta$ is the fluid viscosity.

The resulting expression for the drag is known as Stokes' drag:
$$\begin{align}
\mathbf{F}_D &= -6 \pi \eta r v\\
&= \frac{\rho v^2 C_{\mathrm D } \pi r^2}{2}\\
\end{align}$$

For example, consider a small sphere with radius $r$ = 0.5 micrometre (diameter = 1.0 μm) moving through water at a velocity $v$ of 10 μm/s. Using 10^{−3} Pa·s as the dynamic viscosity of water in SI units, we find a drag force of 0.09 pN. This is about the drag force that a bacterium experiences as it swims through water.

The above formula for drag force can be used to calculate the coefficient of drag in terms of the Reynolds number for very small (<1) values for Reynolds, again assuming a smooth sphere:

$$\begin{align}
|-6 \pi \eta r v| &= \left|\frac{\rho v^2 C_{\mathrm D } \pi r^2}{2}\right|\\
|12| &= \left|\frac{\rho v C_\mathrm{D} r}{\eta}\right|\\
\mathrm{Re} &= \frac{\rho v L}{\eta}, &&L = 2r\\
|12| &= \left|\frac{C_\mathrm{D} \mathrm{Re}}{2}\right|\\
C_\mathrm{D} &= \frac{24}{\mathrm{Re}}
\end{align}$$

The drag coefficient of a sphere can be determined for the general case of a laminar flow with Reynolds numbers less than $2 \cdot 10^5$ using the following formula:

$$C_\mathrm{D} = \frac{24}{\mathrm{Re}} +\frac{4}{\sqrt{\mathrm{Re}}}+0.4, \mathrm{Re}<2\cdot 10^5$$

A more extensible formula is available up to 10:

$$\begin{align}
C_\mathrm{D} &= \frac{24}{\mathrm{Re}} + \frac{13\mathrm{Re}}{25+5^{.48}\mathrm{Re}^{1.52}} + \frac{.411(2.63\times10^5)^{7.94}\mathrm{Re}^{.06}}{\mathrm{Re}^{8} + \left(2.63\times10^5\right)^8} + \frac{\mathrm{Re}}{4\left(10^6+\mathrm{Re}\right)}, \mathrm{Re} \le 10^6
\end{align}$$

For Reynolds numbers less than 1, Stokes' law applies and the drag coefficient approaches $\frac{24}{Re}$.

== Aerodynamics ==
In aerodynamics, aerodynamic drag, also known as air resistance, is the fluid drag force that acts on any moving solid body in the direction of the air's freestream flow.

- From the body's perspective (near-field approach), the drag results from forces due to pressure distributions over the body surface, symbolized $D_{pr}$.
- Forces due to skin friction, which is a result of viscosity, denoted $D_{f}$.

Alternatively, calculated from the flow field perspective (far-field approach), the drag force results from three natural phenomena: shock waves, vortex sheet, and viscosity.

=== Overview of aerodynamics ===
When the airplane produces lift, another drag component results. Induced drag, symbolized $D_i$, is due to a modification of the pressure distribution due to the trailing vortex system that accompanies the lift production. An alternative perspective on lift and drag is gained from considering the change of momentum of the airflow. The wing intercepts the airflow and forces the flow to move downward. This results in an equal and opposite force acting upward on the wing which is the lift force. The change of momentum of the airflow downward results in a reduction of the rearward momentum of the flow which is the result of a force acting forward on the airflow and applied by the wing to the air flow; an equal but opposite force acts on the wing rearward which is the induced drag. Another drag component, namely wave drag, $D_w$, results from shock waves in transonic and supersonic flight speeds. The shock waves induce changes in the boundary layer and pressure distribution over the body surface.

Therefore, there are three ways of categorizing drag.

1. Pressure drag and friction drag
2. Profile drag and induced drag
3. Vortex drag, wave drag, and wake drag

The pressure distribution acting on a body's surface exerts normal forces on the body. Those forces can be added together and the component of that force that acts downstream represents the drag force, $D_{pr}$. The nature of these normal forces combines shock wave effects, vortex system generation effects, and wake viscous mechanisms.

Viscosity of the fluid has a major effect on drag. In the absence of viscosity, the pressure forces acting to hinder the vehicle are canceled by a pressure force further aft that acts to push the vehicle forward; this is called pressure recovery and the result is that the drag is zero. That is to say, the work the body does on the airflow is reversible and is recovered as there are no frictional effects to convert the flow energy into heat. Pressure recovery acts even in the case of viscous flow. Viscosity, however results in pressure drag and it is the dominant component of drag in the case of vehicles with regions of separated flow, in which the pressure recovery is infective.

The friction drag force, which is a tangential force on the aircraft surface, depends substantially on boundary layer configuration and viscosity. The net friction drag, $D_f$, is calculated as the downstream projection of the viscous forces evaluated over the body's surface. The sum of friction drag and pressure (form) drag is called viscous drag. This drag component is due to viscosity.

=== History ===
The idea that a moving body passing through air or another fluid encounters resistance had been known since the time of Aristotle. According to Mervyn O'Gorman, this was named "drag" by Archibald Reith Low. Louis Charles Breguet's paper of 1922 began efforts to reduce drag by streamlining. Breguet went on to put his ideas into practice by designing several record-breaking aircraft in the 1920s and 1930s. Ludwig Prandtl's boundary layer theory in the 1920s provided the impetus to minimise skin friction. A further major call for streamlining was made by Sir Melvill Jones who provided the theoretical concepts to demonstrate emphatically the importance of streamlining in aircraft design. In 1929 his paper 'The Streamline Airplane' presented to the Royal Aeronautical Society was seminal. He proposed an ideal aircraft that would have minimal drag which led to the concepts of a 'clean' monoplane and retractable undercarriage. The aspect of Jones's paper that most shocked the designers of the time was his plot of the horse power required versus velocity, for an actual and an ideal plane. By looking at a data point for a given aircraft and extrapolating it horizontally to the ideal curve, the velocity gain for the same power can be seen. When Jones finished his presentation, a member of the audience described the results as being of the same level of importance as the Carnot cycle in thermodynamics.

=== Power curve in aviation ===
The power curve: parasitic drag and lift-induced drag vs. airspeed

The interaction of parasitic and induced drag vs. airspeed can be plotted as a characteristic curve, illustrated here. In aviation, this is often referred to as the power curve, and is important to pilots because it shows that, below a certain airspeed, maintaining airspeed counterintuitively requires more thrust as speed decreases, rather than less. The consequences of being "behind the curve" in flight are important and are taught as part of pilot training. At the subsonic airspeeds where the "U" shape of this curve is significant, wave drag has not yet become a factor, and so it is not shown in the curve.

=== Wave drag in transonic and supersonic flow ===
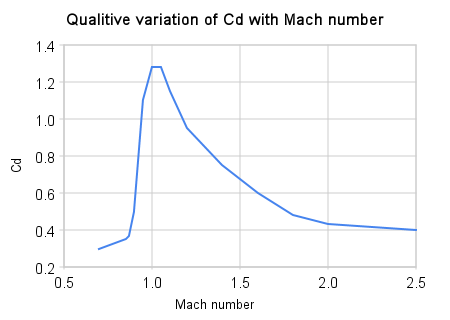
Qualitative variation in Cd factor with Mach number for aircraft

Wave drag, sometimes referred to as compressibility drag, is drag that is created when a body moves in a compressible fluid and at the speed that is close to the speed of sound in that fluid. In aerodynamics, wave drag consists of multiple components depending on the speed regime of the flight.

In transonic flight, wave drag is the result of the formation of shockwaves in the fluid, formed when local areas of supersonic (Mach number greater than 1.0) flow are created. In practice, supersonic flow occurs on bodies traveling well below the speed of sound, as the local speed of air increases as it accelerates over the body to speeds above Mach 1.0. However, full supersonic flow over the vehicle will not develop until well past Mach 1.0. Aircraft flying at transonic speed often incur wave drag through the normal course of operation. In transonic flight, wave drag is commonly referred to as transonic compressibility drag. Transonic compressibility drag increases significantly as the speed of flight increases towards Mach 1.0, dominating other forms of drag at those speeds.

In supersonic flight (Mach numbers greater than 1.0), wave drag is the result of shockwaves present in the fluid and attached to the body, typically oblique shockwaves formed at the leading and trailing edges of the body. In highly supersonic flows, or in bodies with turning angles sufficiently large, unattached shockwaves, or bow waves will instead form. Additionally, local areas of transonic flow behind the initial shockwave may occur at lower supersonic speeds, and can lead to the development of additional, smaller shockwaves present on the surfaces of other lifting bodies, similar to those found in transonic flows. In supersonic flow regimes, wave drag is commonly separated into two components, supersonic lift-dependent wave drag and supersonic volume-dependent wave drag.

The closed form solution for the minimum wave drag of a body of revolution with a fixed length was found by Sears and Haack, and is known as the Sears-Haack Distribution. Similarly, for a fixed volume, the shape for minimum wave drag is the Von Karman Ogive.

The Busemann biplane theoretical concept is not subject to wave drag when operated at its design speed, but is incapable of generating lift in this condition.

== d'Alembert's paradox ==
In 1752 d'Alembert proved that potential flow, the 18th century state-of-the-art inviscid flow theory amenable to mathematical solutions, resulted in the prediction of zero drag. This was in contradiction with experimental evidence, and became known as d'Alembert's paradox. In the 19th century the Navier–Stokes equations for the description of viscous flow were developed by Saint-Venant, Navier, and Stokes. Stokes derived the drag around a sphere at very low Reynolds numbers, the result of which is called Stokes' law.

In the limit of high Reynolds numbers, the Navier–Stokes equations approach the inviscid Euler equations, of which the potential-flow solutions considered by d'Alembert are solutions. However, all experiments at high Reynolds numbers showed there is drag. Attempts to construct inviscid steady flow solutions to the Euler equations, other than the potential flow solutions, did not result in realistic results.

The notion of boundary layers—introduced by Prandtl in 1904, founded on both theory and experiments—explained the causes of drag at high Reynolds numbers. The boundary layer is the thin layer of fluid close to the object's boundary, where viscous effects remain important even when the viscosity is very small (or equivalently the Reynolds number is very large).

== See also ==
- Added mass
- Aerodynamic force
- Angle of attack
- Atmospheric density
- Automobile drag coefficient
- Boundary layer
- Coandă effect
- Drag crisis
- Drag coefficient
- Drag equation
- Gravity drag
- Keulegan–Carpenter number
- Lift (force)
- Morison equation
- Nose cone design
- Parasitic drag
- Trajectory of a projectile with air resistance
- Ram pressure
- Reynolds number
- Satellite drag
- Stall (fluid mechanics)
- Stokes' law
- Terminal velocity
- Wave drag
- Windage

== Bibliography ==
- French, A. P. (1970). Newtonian Mechanics (The M.I.T. Introductory Physics Series) (1st ed.). W. W. White & Company Inc., New York. ISBN 978-0-393-09958-4.
- G. Falkovich (2011). Fluid Mechanics (A short course for physicists). Cambridge University Press. ISBN 978-1-107-00575-4.
- Serway, Raymond A.; Jewett, John W. (2004). Physics for Scientists and Engineers (6th ed.). Brooks/Cole. ISBN 978-0-534-40842-8.
- Tipler, Paul (2004). Physics for Scientists and Engineers: Mechanics, Oscillations and Waves, Thermodynamics (5th ed.). W. H. Freeman. ISBN 978-0-7167-0809-4.
- Huntley, H. E. (1967). Dimensional Analysis. LOC 67-17978.
- Batchelor, George (2000). An introduction to fluid dynamics. Cambridge Mathematical Library (2nd ed.). Cambridge University Press. ISBN 978-0-521-66396-0. MR 1744638.
- L. J. Clancy (1975), Aerodynamics, Pitman Publishing Limited, London. ISBN 978-0-273-01120-0
- Anderson, John D. Jr. (2000); Introduction to Flight, Fourth Edition, McGraw Hill Higher Education, Boston, Massachusetts, USA. 8th ed. 2015, ISBN 978-0078027673.
