= Joseph Valentin Boussinesq =

French mathematician and physicist (1842–1929)

Joseph Boussinesq
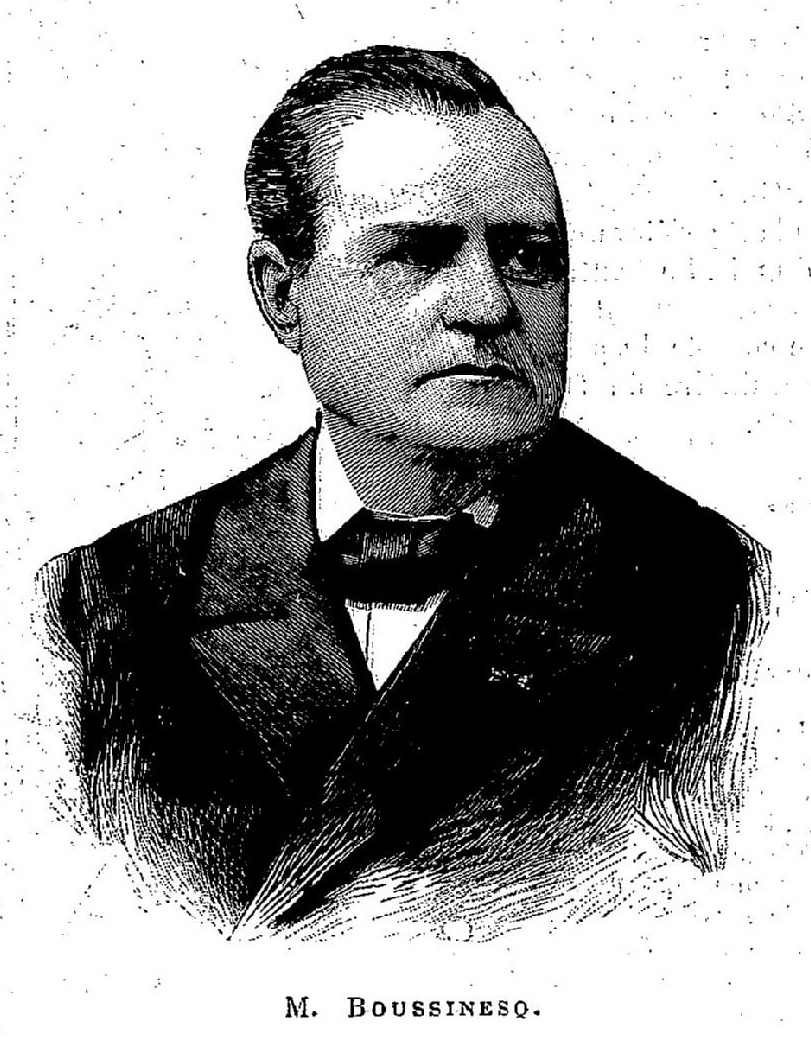
- Joseph Valentin Boussinesq
- Born: 13 March 1842; Saint-André-de-Sangonis, Hérault, France
- Died: 19 February 1929 (aged 86); Paris, France
- Education: Faculty of Sciences of Paris
- Known for: Boussinesq approximation in: buoyancy water waves turbulence
- Awards: Poncelet Price, French Academy of Sciences (1871)
- Scientific career
- Fields: Mathematics; Physics
- Workplaces: Faculty of Sciences of Lille (1872–1886); Faculty of Sciences of Paris (1896–1918)
- Thesis: Étude sur la propagation de la chaleur dans les milieux homogènes (1867)

Joseph Valentin Boussinesq (pronounced [ʒozɛf valɑ̃tɛ̃ businɛsk]; 13 March 1842 – 19 February 1929) was a French mathematician and physicist who made significant contributions to the theory of hydrodynamics, vibration, light, and heat.

== Biography ==
From 1872 to 1886, he was appointed professor at Faculty of Sciences of Lille, lecturing differential and integral calculus at Institut industriel du Nord (École centrale de Lille). From 1896 to his retirement in 1918, he was professor of mechanics at Faculty of Sciences of Paris.

John Scott Russell experimentally observed solitary waves in 1834 and reported it during the 1844 Meeting of the British Association for the advancement of science. Subsequently, this was developed into the modern physics of solitons. In 1871, Boussinesq published the first mathematical theory to support Russell's experimental observation, and in 1877 introduced the Korteweg–De Vries equation. In 1876, Lord Rayleigh published his mathematical theory to support Russell's experimental observation. At the end of his paper, Rayleigh admitted that Boussinesq's theory came before his.

In 1897, he published Théorie de l'écoulement tourbillonnant et tumultueux des liquides ("Theory of the swirling and agitated flow of liquids"), a work that greatly contributed to the study of turbulence and hydrodynamics.

The word "turbulence" was never used by Boussinesq. He used sentences such as "écoulement tourbillonnant et tumultueux" (vortex or tumultuous flow). The first mention of the word "turbulence" in French or English scientific fluid mechanics literature (the word "turbulence" existed in other context) can be found in a paper by Lord Kelvin in 1887.

== Books ==
- Théorie de l'écoulement tourbillonnant et tumultueux des liquides dans les lits rectilignes a grande section (vol.1) (Gauthier-Villars, 1897)
- Cours d'analyse infinitésimale à l'usage des personnes qui étudient cette science en vue de ses applications mécaniques et physiques Tome 1, Fascicule 1 (Gauthier-Villars et fils, 1887-1890)
- Cours d'analyse infinitésimale à l'usage des personnes qui étudient cette science en vue de ses applications mécaniques et physiques Tome 1, Fascicule 2 (Gauthier-Villars et fils, 1887-1890)
- Cours d'analyse infinitésimale à l'usage des personnes qui étudient cette science en vue de ses applications mécaniques et physiques Tome 2, Fascicule 1 (Gauthier-Villars et fils, 1887-1890)
- Cours d'analyse infinitésimale à l'usage des personnes qui étudient cette science en vue de ses applications mécaniques et physiques Tome 2, Fascicule 2 (Gauthier-Villars et fils, 1887-1890)
- Théorie analytique de la chaleur Volume 1 (Gauthier-Villars, 1901-1903)
- Théorie analytique de la chaleur Volume 2 (Gauthier-Villars, 1901-1903)
- Leçons synthétiques de mécanique générale servant d'introduction au cours de mécanique physique de la Faculté des sciences de Paris (Gauthier-Villars, 1889)
- Application des potentiels à l'étude de l'équilibre et du mouvement des solides élastiques (Gauthier-Villars, 1885)

== See also ==
- Boussinesq approximation (buoyancy) for buoyancy-driven flows for small density differences in the fluid
- Boussinesq approximation (water waves) for long waves propagating on the surface of a fluid layer under the action of gravity
- Turbulence modeling and eddy viscosity for the Boussinesq approximation resulting in the use of an eddy viscosity to model the turbulence Reynolds stresses
- Boussinesq–Basset force for the history force on particles in an accelerating Stokes flow
- Basset–Boussinesq–Oseen equation (BBO equation) for the motion of – and forces on – a particle moving in an unsteady flow at low Reynolds numbers
- Boussinesq–Cerruti solution
- Clapotis
- Flamant solution
- Hagen–Poiseuille equation
- Laboratoire de mécanique de Lille
