= Response amplitude operator =

Engineering statistic in ship design

In the field of ship design and design of other floating structures, a response amplitude operator (RAO) is an engineering statistic, or set of such statistics, that are used to determine the likely behavior of a ship when operating at sea. Known by the acronym of RAO, response amplitude operators are usually obtained from models of proposed ship designs tested in a model basin, or from running specialized CFD computer programs, often both. RAOs are usually calculated for all ship motions and for all wave headings.

== Usage ==
RAOs are effectively transfer functions used to determine the effect that a sea state will have upon the motion of a ship through the water, and therefore, for example, whether or not (in the case of cargo vessels) the addition of cargo to the vessel will require measures to be taken to improve stability and prevent the cargo from shifting within the vessel. Generation of extensive RAOs at the design phase allows shipbuilders to determine the modifications to a design that may be required for safety reasons (i.e., to make the design robust and resistant to capsizing or sinking in highly adverse sea conditions) or to improve performance (e.g., improve top speed, fuel consumption, stability in rough seas). RAOs are computed in tandem with the generation of a hydrodynamic database, which is a model of the effects of water pressure upon the ship's hull under a wide variety of flow conditions. Together, the RAOs and hydrodynamic database provide (inasmuch as this is possible within modelling and engineering constraints) certain assurances about the behavior of a proposed ship design. They also allow the designer to dimension the ship or structure so it will hold up to the most extreme sea states it will likely be subjected to (based on sea state statistics).

Additionally, RAOs are amplitude operators which enables to determine amplitude of motion based on a unitary wave. They are superposable, thus effective on sea state based probability solutions.

== RAOs in ship design ==
Different modelling and design criteria will affect the nature of the 'ideal' RAO curves (as plotted graphically) being sought for a particular ship: for example, an ocean cruise liner will have a considerable emphasis placed upon minimizing accelerations to ensure the comfort of the passengers, while the stability concerns for a naval warship will be concentrated upon making the ship an effective weapons platform.

1. Finding the forces on the ship when it is restrained from motion and subjected to regular waves. The forces acting on the body are:
  1. The Froude–Krylov force, which is the pressure in the undisturbed waves integrated over the wetted surface of the floating vessel.
  2. The Diffraction forces, which are pressures that occur due to the disturbances in the water because of a body being present.
1. Finding the forces on the ship when it is forced to oscillate in still water conditions. The forces are divided into:
  1. Added mass forces due to having to accelerate the water along with the ship.
  2. Damping (Hydrodynamic) forces due to the oscillations creating outgoing waves which carry energy away from the ship.
  3. Restoring forces due to bringing the buoyancy/weight and moment equilibrium out of balance.

In the above, "Ship" must be interpreted widely to also include other forms of floating structures. The obvious problem in the above method is the neglection of viscous forces which contribute heavily in modes of motion like surge and roll.

On a computer the above algorithm was first introduced by using strip theory and Boundary Element Method. Today both of the methods are still used if the need for fast calculations outweigh the need for precise results and the ship designer knows the limitations of strip theory. More advanced programs that are used today utilizes Boundary Element Method through different applications (such as WAMIT, SESAM WADAM, MOSES, NeMOH and ANSYS AQWA) some may also include the effects of viscosity. The insight into the forces that governs the seakeeping behavior of a ship gained from the above are of course still valid within considered limits of free surface linearity.

== Calculating the RAO ==
The RAO is a transfer function that is only defined when the ship motions can be assumed to be linear. The above forces can then be assembled into an equation of motion:

$$\big[ M + A(\omega) \big]  \ddot x + B(\omega) \dot x + C x = F(\omega)$$

Where $x$ is a rigid body motion such as heave, $\omega$ is the oscillation frequency, $M$ is the structural mass and inertia $A(\omega)$ is the added mass (frequency dependent), $B(\omega)$ is the linear damping (frequency dependent), $C$ is the restoring force coefficient (stiffness matrix) and $F(\omega)$ is the harmonic excitation force proportional to the incoming wave $\zeta = \zeta_a e^{i\omega t}$. Here $\zeta_a$ is the wave amplitude.

If we assume $x=a e^{i\omega t}$ this can be solved for $a$ and the RAO is then:

$$\mathrm{RAO}(\omega) = \frac{a}{\zeta_a} = \frac{F_0}{C - (M+A(\omega)) \omega^2 + i B(\omega) \omega}$$

where $F_0$ is the linear excitation force complex amplitude per wave height. The RAO is a frequency dependent and complex function (the $i$ in the above expression is the imaginary unit). It is common to only consider the absolute value of the RAO if the phase between the excitation and the ship motions are irrelevant.

It is common to add a linearised viscous damping term, $B_v$ to account for the strong non-linearity of the damping force, especially in the roll motion. This term is for simplicity often taken as a fraction of the critical damping, $B_v = \xi\ B_\text{crit}$. The expression is then:

$$\big[ M + A(\omega) \big]  \ddot x + \big[ B(\omega) + B_v \big] \dot x + C x = F(\omega)$$

where:

$$B_v = \xi\ B_\text{crit} = \xi\ 2 \sqrt{(A(\omega) + M) C}$$

A good simplification is to use the infinite frequency added mass, $A_\infty = \lim_{\omega \to \infty} A(\omega)$ in the above expression to find a frequency independent critical damping value.

== See also ==
- Ship motions
- Ship design
- Naval architecture
