= Drag equation =

Equation for the force of drag

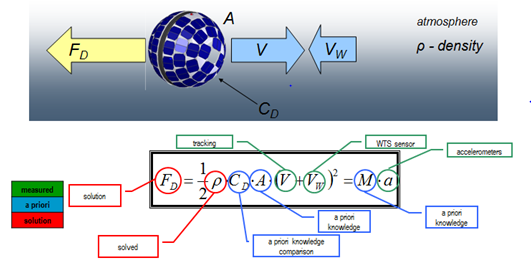
DANDE drag equation

In fluid dynamics, the drag equation is a formula used to calculate the force of drag experienced by an object due to movement through a fully enclosing fluid. The equation is:
$$F_{\rm d}\, =\, \tfrac12\, \rho\, u^2\, c_{\rm d}\, A$$
where

- $F_{\rm d}$ is the drag force, which is by definition the force component in the direction of the flow velocity,
- $\rho$ is the mass density of the fluid,
- $u$ is the flow velocity relative to the object,
- $A$ is the reference area, and
- $c_{\rm d}$ is the drag coefficient – a dimensionless coefficient related to the object's geometry.

The equation is attributed to Lord Rayleigh, who originally used L^{2} in place of A (with L being some linear dimension).

The reference area A is typically defined as the area of the orthographic projection of the object on a plane perpendicular to the direction of motion. For non-hollow objects with simple shape, such as a sphere, this is exactly the same as the maximal cross sectional area. For other objects (for instance, a rolling tube or the body of a cyclist), A may be significantly larger than the area of any cross section along any plane perpendicular to the direction of motion. Airfoils use the square of the chord length as the reference area; since airfoil chords are usually defined with a length of 1, the reference area is also 1. Aircraft use the wing area (or rotor-blade area) as the reference area, which makes for an easy comparison to lift. Airships and bodies of revolution use the volumetric coefficient of drag, in which the reference area is the square of the cube root of the airship's volume. Sometimes different reference areas are given for the same object in which case a drag coefficient corresponding to each of these different areas must be given.

The drag coefficient $c_{\rm d}$ is defined in combination with the choice of reference area and captures both skin friction and form drag. If the fluid is a liquid, $c_{\rm d}$ depends on the Reynolds number; if the fluid is a gas, $c_{\rm d}$ depends on both the Reynolds number and the Mach number.

For sharp-cornered bluff bodies, like square cylinders and plates held transverse to the flow direction, this equation is applicable with the drag coefficient as a constant value when the Reynolds number is greater than 1000. For smooth bodies, like a cylinder, the drag coefficient may vary significantly until Reynolds numbers up to 10^{7} (ten million).

== Discussion ==
The equation is easier understood for the idealized situation where all of the fluid impinges on the reference area and comes to a complete stop, building up stagnation pressure over the whole area. No real object exactly corresponds to this behavior. $c_{\rm d}$ is the ratio of drag for any real object to that of the ideal object. In practice a rough un-streamlined body (a bluff body) will have a $c_{\rm d}$ of approximately 1. Smoother objects can have much lower values of $c_{\rm d}$. The equation is precise – it simply provides the definition of $c_{\rm d}$ (drag coefficient), which varies with the Reynolds number and is found by experiment.

Of particular importance is the $u^2$ dependence on flow velocity, meaning that fluid drag increases with the square of flow velocity. When flow velocity is doubled, for example, not only does the fluid strike with twice the flow velocity, but twice the mass of fluid strikes per second. Therefore, the change of momentum per time, i.e. the force experienced, is multiplied by four. This is in contrast with solid-on-solid dynamic friction, which generally has very little velocity dependence.

== Relation with dynamic pressure ==
The drag force can also be specified as
$$F_{\rm d} \propto P_{\rm D} A$$
where P_{D} is the pressure exerted by the fluid on area A. Here the pressure P_{D} is referred to as dynamic pressure due to the kinetic energy of the fluid experiencing relative flow velocity u. This is defined in similar form as the kinetic energy equation:
$$P_{\rm D} = \frac12 \rho u^2$$

== Derivation ==
=== Derivation using Bernoulli's Equation ===
Since air is a gas and therefore a fluid (in the physics sense) we can derive the drag equation by using Bernoulli's equation and the fundamental pressure equation.

$P=\frac{D}{A}\Rightarrow D=PA$

From Bernoulli's equation $P=\frac{1}{2}\rho v^{2}+\rho g\Delta h$

Combine those two equations and you get $D=(\frac{1}{2}\rho v^{2}+\rho g\Delta h) A$

Then plug in the drag coefficient $C$ which takes into account other parameters as well and is experimentally found too.

$D=(\frac{1}{2}\rho v^{2}+\rho g\Delta h)AC$ And you get the drag equation. But you may notice that it differs from the one you show above because it really does. This one has one more part: $+\rho g\Delta h$ This is because the difference of height ∆h is usually ignored, because it is said to be tiny relative to what the other part of the equation gives us.

Then we can get an equation like that:

$D=\frac{1}{2}C\rho Av^{2}$

Where:

- $D$ is the magnitude of the drag force applied to the body moving relative to the fluid by the fluid
- $C$ is the drag coefficient
- $\rho$ is the density of the fluid
- $A$ is the cross-sectional area of the body which is moving relative to the fluid
- $v$ is the magnitude of the relative velocity between the body and the fluid. This is 1 way of deriving an equation from which we can calculate the force that a fluid applies to a body which moves relative to it

=== Derivation using dimensional analysis ===
The drag equation may be derived to within a multiplicative constant by the method of dimensional analysis. If a moving fluid meets an object, it exerts a force on the object. Suppose that the fluid is a liquid, and the variables involved – under some conditions

- speed u,
- fluid density ρ,
- kinematic viscosity ν of the fluid,
- size of the body, expressed in terms of its wetted area A, and
- drag force F_{d}.

Using the algorithm of the Buckingham π theorem, these five variables can be reduced to two dimensionless groups:

- drag coefficient c_{d} and
- Reynolds number Re.

That this is so becomes apparent when the drag force F_{d} is expressed as part of a function of the other variables in the problem:

$$f_a(F_{\rm d}, u, A, \rho, \nu) = 0.$$

This rather odd form of expression is used because it does not assume a one-to-one relationship. Here, f_{a} is some (as-yet-unknown) function that takes five arguments. Now the right-hand side is zero in any system of units; so it should be possible to express the relationship described by f_{a} in terms of only dimensionless groups.

There are many ways of combining the five arguments of f_{a} to form dimensionless groups, but the Buckingham π theorem states that there will be two such groups. The most appropriate are the Reynolds number, given by

$$\mathrm{Re} = \frac{u\sqrt{A}}{\nu}$$

and the drag coefficient, given by

$$c_{\rm d} = \frac{F_{\rm d}}{\frac12 \rho A u^2}.$$

Thus the function of five variables may be replaced by another function of only two variables:

$$f_b\left(\frac{F_{\rm d}}{\frac12 \rho A u^2}, \frac{u \sqrt{A}}{\nu} \right) = 0.$$

where f_{b} is some function of two arguments. The original law is then reduced to a law involving only these two numbers.

Because the only unknown in the above equation is the drag force F_{d}, it is possible to express it as

$$\begin{align}
\frac{F_{\rm d}}{\frac12 \rho A u^2} &= f_c\left(\frac{u \sqrt{A}}{\nu} \right) \\
F_{\rm d} &= \tfrac12 \rho A u^2 f_c(\mathrm{Re}) \\
c_{\rm d} &= f_c(\mathrm{Re})
\end{align}$$

Thus the force is simply 1/2 ρ A u^{2} times some (as-yet-unknown) function f_{c} of the Reynolds number Re – a considerably simpler system than the original five-argument function given above.

Dimensional analysis thus makes a very complex problem (trying to determine the behavior of a function of five variables) a much simpler one: the determination of the drag as a function of only one variable, the Reynolds number.

If the fluid is a gas, certain properties of the gas influence the drag and those properties must also be taken into account. Those properties are conventionally considered to be the absolute temperature of the gas, and the ratio of its specific heats. These two properties determine the speed of sound in the gas at its given temperature. The Buckingham pi theorem then leads to a third dimensionless group, the ratio of the relative velocity to the speed of sound, which is known as the Mach number. Consequently when a body is moving relative to a gas, the drag coefficient varies with the Mach number and the Reynolds number.

The analysis also gives other information for free, so to speak. The analysis shows that, other things being equal, the drag force will be proportional to the density of the fluid. This kind of information often proves to be extremely valuable, especially in the early stages of a research project.

To empirically determine the Reynolds number dependence, instead of experimenting on a large body with fast-flowing fluids (such as real-size airplanes in wind tunnels), one may just as well experiment using a small model in a flow of higher velocity because these two systems deliver similitude by having the same Reynolds number. If the same Reynolds number and Mach number cannot be achieved just by using a flow of higher velocity it may be advantageous to use a fluid of greater density or lower viscosity.

== See also ==
- Aerodynamic drag
- Angle of attack
- Morison equation
- Newton's sine-square law of air resistance
- Stall (flight)
- Terminal velocity
