= Restoring force =

Physical force acting to bring a system back toward equilibrium

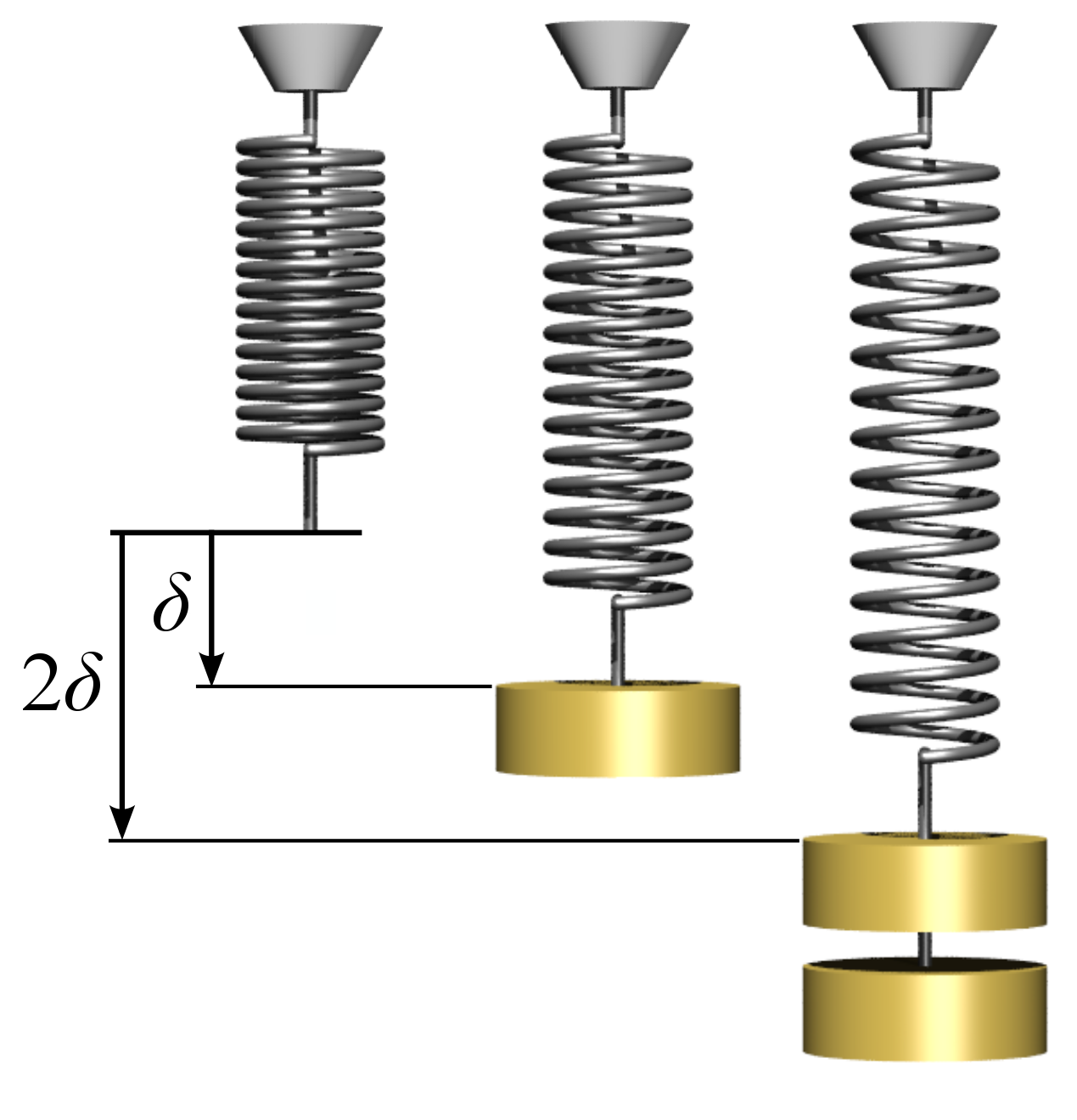
A diagram demonstrating Hooke’s Law, a description of restoring forces in springs

In physics, the restoring force is a force that acts to bring a body to its equilibrium position. The restoring force is a function only of position of the mass or particle, and it is always directed back toward the equilibrium position of the system. The restoring force is often referred to in simple harmonic motion. The force responsible for restoring original size and shape is called the restoring force.

An example is the action of a spring. An idealized spring exerts a force proportional to the amount of deformation of the spring from its equilibrium length, exerted in a direction oppose the deformation. Pulling the spring to a greater length causes it to exert a force that brings the spring back toward its equilibrium length. The amount of force can be determined by multiplying the spring constant, characteristic of the spring, by the amount of stretch, also known as Hooke's law.

Another example is of a pendulum. When a pendulum is not swinging all the forces acting on it are in equilibrium. The force due to gravity and the mass of the object at the end of the pendulum is equal to the tension in the string holding the object up. When a pendulum is put in motion, the place of equilibrium is at the bottom of the swing, the location where the pendulum rests. When the pendulum is at the top of its swing the force returning the pendulum to this midpoint is gravity. As a result, gravity may be seen as a restoring force.

== See also ==
- Response amplitude operator
