= Newton's sine-square law of air resistance =

Physical law

Isaac Newton's sine-squared law of air resistance is a formula that implies the force on a flat plate immersed in a moving fluid is proportional to the square of the sine of the angle of attack. Although Newton did not analyze the force on a flat plate himself, the techniques he used for spheres, cylinders, and conical bodies were later applied to a flat plate to arrive at this formula. In 1687, Newton devoted the second volume of his Principia Mathematica to fluid mechanics.

The analysis assumes that the fluid particles are moving at a uniform speed prior to impacting the plate and then follow the surface of the plate after contact. Particles passing above and below the plate are assumed to be unaffected and any particle-to-particle interaction is ignored. This leads to the following formula:

$$F = \rho v^2 S \sin^2(\alpha)$$

where F is the force on the plate (oriented perpendicular to the plate), $\rho$ is the density of the fluid, v is the velocity of the fluid, S is the surface area of the plate, and $\alpha$ is the angle of attack.

More sophisticated analysis and experimental evidence have shown that this formula is inaccurate; although Newton's analysis correctly predicted that the force was proportional to the density, the surface area of the plate, and the square of the velocity, the proportionality to the square of the sine of the angle of attack is incorrect. The force is directly proportional to the sine of the angle of attack, or for small values of $\alpha, \alpha$ itself.

The assumed variation with the square of the sine predicted that the lift component would be much smaller than it actually is. This was frequently cited by detractors of heavier-than-air flight to "prove" it was impossible or impractical.

Ironically, the sine squared formula has had a rebirth in modern aerodynamics; the assumptions of rectilinear flow and non-interactions between particles are applicable at hypersonic speeds and the sine-squared formula leads to reasonable predictions.

In 1744, 17 years after Newton's death, the French mathematician Jean le Rond d'Alembert attempted to use the mathematical methods of the day to describe and quantify the forces acting on a body moving relative to a fluid. It proved impossible and d'Alembert was forced to conclude that he could not devise a mathematical method to describe the force on a body, even though practical experience showed such a force always exists. This has become known as D'Alembert's paradox.

== See also ==
- Graph of Sine Squared
