= Froude–Krylov force =

Hydrodynamic force from the pressure field generated by undisturbed waves

In fluid dynamics, the Froude–Krylov force, sometimes also called the Froude–Kriloff force, is a hydrodynamical force. The Froude–Krylov force is the force introduced by the unsteady pressure field generated by undisturbed waves. The Froude–Krylov force does, together with the diffraction force, make up the total non-viscous forces acting on a floating body in regular waves. The diffraction force is due to the floating body disturbing the waves.

The concept is named after the work of William Froude in 1861 on ship stability, and after Aleksey Krylov who rigorously studied the phenomenon as the source of ship oscillations in the 1890s.

== Formulas ==
The Froude–Krylov force can be calculated from the surface integral:

$$\vec F_{\rm FK} = - \iint_{S_{\mathrm w}} p ~ \hat n ~\mathrm ds,$$

where

- $\vec F_{\rm FK}$ is the Froude–Krylov force,
- $S_{\mathrm w}$ is the wetted surface of the floating body,
- $p$ is the pressure in the undisturbed waves and
- $\hat n$ the body's normal vector pointing into the water.

In the simplest case the formula may be expressed as the product of the wetted surface area (A) of the floating body, and the dynamic pressure acting from the waves on the body:

$$F_{\rm FK} = A p_{\rm dyn}.$$

The dynamic pressure, $p_{\rm dyn}$, close to the surface, is given by:

$$p_{\rm dyn} =\frac12 \rho g  H,$$

where

- $\rho$ is the sea water density (approx. 1030 kg/m^{3})
- $g$ is the acceleration due to the earth's gravity (9.81 m/s^{2})
- $H$ is the wave height from crest to trough.

== See also ==
- Response amplitude operator
