= Novikov–Veselov equation =

Nonlinear partial differential equation

In mathematical physics, the Novikov–Veselov equation (or Veselov–Novikov equation) is a nonlinear partial differential equation. It is a two-dimensional analogue of the well-known Korteweg–de Vries equation (KdV equation), which can model shallow water waves. A key feature of the Novikov–Veselov equation is its integrability, meaning it can be solved exactly through a method known as the inverse scattering transform.

The equation's integrability is linked to the two-dimensional stationary Schrödinger equation, just as the KdV equation's integrability is linked to the one-dimensional Schrödinger equation. This property distinguishes it from other two-dimensional analogues of the KdV equation, such as the Kadomtsev–Petviashvili equation. The equation is named after Soviet mathematicians Sergei P. Novikov and A.P. Veselov, who introduced it in Novikov & Veselov (1984).

== Definition ==
The Novikov–Veselov equation is most commonly written as

$$\begin{align}
& \partial_{t} v = 4\; \Re \left\{ 4 \partial_{z}^3v + \partial_{z} ( v w ) - E \partial_{z} w \right\}, \\
& \partial_{\bar z} w = - 3 \partial_{ z } v,
\end{align}$$

1

where $v = v( x_1, x_2, t ),$ $w = w( x_1, x_2, t )$ and the following standard notation of complex analysis is used: $\Re$ is the real part,

$$\partial_{ z } = \frac{ 1 }{ 2 } ( \partial_{ x_1 } - i \partial_{ x_2 } ), \quad
\partial_{ \bar z } = \frac{ 1 }{ 2 } ( \partial_{ x_1 } + i \partial_{ x_2 } ).$$

The function $v$ is generally considered to be real-valued. The function $w$ is an auxiliary function defined via $v$ up to a holomorphic summand, $E$ is a real parameter corresponding to the energy level of the related 2-dimensional Schrödinger equation

$$L \psi = E \psi, \quad L = - \Delta + v( x, t ), \quad \Delta = \partial_{x_1}^2 + \partial_{x_2}^2.$$

== Relation to other nonlinear integrable equations ==
When the functions $v$ and $w$ in the Novikov–Veselov equation depend only on one spatial variable, e.g. $v = v( x_1, t )$, $w = w( x_1, t )$, then the equation is reduced to the classical Korteweg–de Vries equation. If in the Novikov–Veselov equation $E \to \pm \infty$, then the equation reduces to another (2+1)-dimensional analogue of the KdV equation, the Kadomtsev–Petviashvili equation (to KP-I and KP-II, respectively) (Zakharov & Shulman 1991).

== History ==
The inverse scattering transform method for solving nonlinear partial differential equations (PDEs) begins with the discovery of C.S. Gardner, J.M. Greene, M.D. Kruskal, R.M. Miura (Gardner et al. 1967), who demonstrated that the Korteweg–de Vries equation can be integrated via the inverse scattering problem for the 1-dimensional stationary Schrödinger equation. The algebraic nature of this discovery was revealed by Lax who showed that the Korteweg–de Vries equation can be written in the following operator form (the so-called Lax pair):

$\frac{\partial L}{\partial t} = [ L, A ],$

2

where $L = - \partial_{x}^2 + v( x, t )$, $A = \partial_{x}^3 + \frac{3}{4}( v( x, t ) \partial_{x} + \partial_{x}v( x, t ) )$ and $[\cdot, \cdot]$ is a commutator. Equation (1) is a compatibility condition for the equations

$$\begin{align}
& L \psi = \lambda \psi, \\
& \psi_{ t } = A \psi
\end{align}$$

for all values of $\lambda$.

Afterwards, a representation of the form (2) was found for many other physically interesting nonlinear equations, like the Kadomtsev–Petviashvili equation, sine-Gordon equation, nonlinear Schrödinger equation and others. This led to an extensive development of the theory of inverse scattering transform for integrating nonlinear partial differential equations.

When trying to generalize representation (2) to two dimensions, one obtains that it holds only for trivial cases (operators $L$, $A$, $B$ have constant coefficients or operator $L$ is a differential operator of order not larger than 1 with respect to one of the variables). However, S.V. Manakov showed that in the two-dimensional case it is more correct to consider the following representation (further called the Manakov L-A-B triple):

$\frac{\partial L}{\partial t} = [ L, A ] + BL,$

3

or, equivalently, to search for the condition of compatibility of the equations

$$\begin{align}
& L \psi = \lambda \psi, \\
& \psi_{ t } = A \psi
\end{align}$$

at one fixed value of parameter $\lambda$ (Manakov 1976).

Representation (3) for the 2-dimensional Schrödinger operator $L$ was found by S.P. Novikov and A.P. Veselov in (Novikov & Veselov 1984). The authors also constructed a hierarchy of evolution equations integrable via the inverse scattering transform for the 2-dimensional Schrödinger equation at fixed energy. This set of evolution equations (which is sometimes called the hierarchy of the Novikov–Veselov equations) contains, in particular, the equation (1).

== Physical applications ==
The dispersionless version of the Novikov–Veselov equation was derived in a model of nonlinear geometrical optics (Konopelchenko & Moro 2004).

== Behavior of solutions ==
The behavior of solutions to the Novikov–Veselov equation depends essentially on the regularity of the scattering data for this solution. If the scattering data are regular, then the solution vanishes uniformly with time. If the scattering data have singularities, then the solution may develop solitons. For example, the scattering data of the Grinevich–Zakharov soliton solutions of the Novikov–Veselov equation have singular points.

Solitons are traditionally a key object of study in the theory of nonlinear integrable equations. The solitons of the Novikov–Veselov equation at positive energy are transparent potentials, similarly to the one-dimensional case (in which solitons are reflectionless potentials). However, unlike the one-dimensional case where there exist well-known exponentially decaying solitons, the Novikov–Veselov equation (at least at non-zero energy) does not possess exponentially localized solitons (Novikov 2011).
