= Kruskal =

Kruskal may refer to any of the following, of whom the first three are brothers:

- William Kruskal (1919–2005), American mathematician and statistician
- Martin David Kruskal (1925–2006), American mathematician and physicist
- Joseph Kruskal (1928–2010), American mathematician, statistician and computer scientist, known for Kruskal's algorithm
- Clyde Kruskal (born 1954), American computer scientist, son of Martin
