= Schamel equation =

The Schamel equation (S-equation) is a nonlinear partial differential equation of first order in time and third order in space. Similar to a Korteweg–De Vries equation (KdV), it describes the development of a localized, coherent wave structure that propagates in a nonlinear dispersive medium. It was first derived in 1973 by Hans Schamel to describe the effects of electron trapping in the trough of the potential of a solitary electrostatic wave structure travelling with ion acoustic speed in a two-component plasma. It now applies to various localized pulse dynamics such as:

- electron and ion holes or phase space vortices in collision-free plasmas such as space plasmas,
- axisymmetric pulse propagation in physically stiffened nonlinear cylindrical shells,
- "Soliton" propagation in nonlinear transmission lines or in fiber optics and laser physics.

== The equation ==
The Schamel equation is

$$\phi_t + (1 + b \sqrt \phi ) \phi_x + \phi_{xxx} = 0,$$

where $\phi_{(t,x)}$ stands for $\partial_{(t,x)}\phi$. In the case of ion-acoustic solitary waves, the parameter $b$ reflects the effect of electrons trapped in the trough of the electrostatic potential $\phi$. It is given by $b=\frac{1-\beta}{\sqrt \pi}$, where $\beta$, the trapping parameter, reflects the status of the trapped electrons, $\beta=0$ representing a flat-topped stationary trapped electron distribution, $\beta<0$ a dip or depression. It holds $0\le\phi \le\psi\ll 1$, where $\psi$ is the wave amplitude. All quantities are normalized: the potential energy by electron thermal energy, the velocity by ion sound speed, time by inverse ion plasma frequency and space by electron Debye length. Note that for a KdV equation $b\sqrt \phi$ is replaced by $\phi$ such that the nonlinearity becomes bilinear (see later).

== Solitary wave solution ==
The steady state solitary wave solution, $\phi(x-v_0t)$, is given in the comoving frame by:

$$\phi(x)=\psi \operatorname{sech}^4 \left( \sqrt{\frac{b\sqrt \psi}{30}} x \right)$$

$$v_0 = 1 + \frac{8}{15} b \sqrt \psi.$$

The speed of the structure is supersonic, $v_0>1$, since $b$ has to be positive, $0<b$, which corresponds in the ion acoustic case to a depressed trapped electron distribution $\beta <1$.

== Proof by pseudo-potential method ==
The proof of this solution uses the analogy to classical mechanics via
$\phi_{xx} =: - \mathcal {V} '(\phi)$ with $\mathcal {V}(\phi)$, being the corresponding pseudo-potential. From this we get by an integration: $\frac{\phi_x^2}{2} + \mathcal{V(\phi)} = 0$, which represents the pseudo-energy, and from the Schamel equation: $- \mathcal{V}(\phi) = \frac{(v_0 - 1)}{2} \phi^2 - \frac{4b}{15} \phi^{5/2}$. Through the obvious demand, namely that at potential maximum, $\phi=\psi$, the slope $\phi_x$ of $\phi$ vanishes we get: $\mathcal{V}(\psi)=0$. This is a nonlinear dispersion relation (NDR) because it determines the phase velocity $v_0$ given by the second expression. The canonical form of $\mathcal {V}(\phi)$ is obtained by replacing $v_0$ with the NDR. It becomes:

$$- \mathcal {V}(\phi) =\frac{4}{15} b \phi^2 (\sqrt \psi -\sqrt \phi).$$

The use of this expression in $x(\phi)= \int_\phi^\psi \frac{d\xi}{\sqrt{-2\mathcal{V}(\xi)}}$, which follows from the pseudo-energy law, yields by integration:

$$x(\phi) =\sqrt{ \frac{30}{b\sqrt\psi}} \tanh^{-1} \left( \sqrt{1-\sqrt\frac{\phi}{\psi}}\right).$$

This is the inverse function of $\phi(x)$ as given in the first equation. Note that the integral in the denominator of $x(\phi)$ exists and can be expressed by known mathematical functions. Hence $\phi (x)$ is a mathematically disclosed function. However, the structure often remains mathematically undisclosed, i.e. it cannot be expressed by known functions (see for instance Sect. Logarithmic Schamel equation). This generally happens if more than one trapping scenarios are involved, as e.g. in driven intermittent plasma turbulence.

== Non-integrability ==
In contrast to the KdV equation, the Schamel equation is an example of a non-integrable evolution equation. It only has a finite number of (polynomial) constants of motion and does not pass a Painlevé test. Since a so-called Lax pair (L,P) does not exist, it is not integrable by the inverse scattering transform.

== Generalizations ==
=== Schamel–Korteweg–de Vries equation ===
Taking into account the next order in the expression for the expanded electron density, we get $n_e= 1 + \phi - \frac{4 b}{3} \phi^{3/2} + \frac{1}{2}\phi^2 + \cdots$, from which we obtain the pseudo-potential -$\mathcal{V}(\phi)=\frac{8b}{15}\phi^2 (\sqrt\psi -\sqrt\phi) +\frac{1}{3}\phi^2 (\psi -\phi)$. The corresponding evolution equation then becomes:

$$\phi_t + (1 + b \sqrt \phi + \phi) \phi_x + \phi_{xxx} = 0,$$

which is the Schamel–Korteweg–de Vries equation.

Its solitary wave solution reads

$$\phi(x)=\psi \operatorname{sech}^4 (y)\left[1 + \frac{1}{1+Q}\tanh^2(y) \right]^{-2}$$

with $y=\frac{x}{2}\sqrt{\frac{\psi(1+Q)}{12}}$ and $Q=\frac{8b}{5\sqrt{ \psi}}$. Depending on Q it has two limiting solitary wave solutions: For $1\ll Q$ we find $\phi(x)=\psi \operatorname{sech}^4(\sqrt{\frac{b\sqrt \psi}{30}} x)$, the Schamel solitary wave.

For $1\gg Q$ we get $\phi(x)=\psi \operatorname{sech}^2(\sqrt{\frac{\psi}{12}} x)$ which represents the ordinary ion acoustic soliton. The latter is fluid-like and is achieved for $b=0$ or $\beta=1$ representing an isothermal electron equation of state. Note that the absence of a trapping effect (b = 0) does not imply the absence of trapping, a statement that is usually misrepresented in the literature, especially in textbooks. As long as $\psi$ is nonzero, there is always a nonzero trapping width $2\sqrt{2\phi}$ in velocity space for the electron distribution function.

=== Logarithmic Schamel equation ===
Another generalization of the S-equation is obtained in the case of ion acoustic waves by admitting a second trapping channel. By considering an additional, non-perturbative trapping scenario, Schamel received:

$\qquad \qquad \phi_t + (1 + b \sqrt \phi - D \ln\phi) \phi_x + \phi_{xxx} = 0$,

a generalization called logarithmic S-equation. In the absence of the square root nonlinearity, $b=0$, it is solved by a Gaussian shaped hole solution: $\phi(x)=\psi e^{Dx^2/4}$ with $D<0$ and has a supersonic phase velocity
$v_0=1 + D(\ln \psi - 3/2) > 1$. The corresponding pseudo-potential is given by $-\mathcal {V}(\phi)= D \frac{\phi^2}{2}\ln \frac{\phi}{\psi}$. From this follows $x(\phi)= 2 \sqrt{-D \ln \frac{\psi}{\phi}}$ which is the inverse function of the Gaussian mentioned. For a non-zero b, keeping $D$, the integral to get $x (\phi)$ can no longer be solved analytically, i.e. by known mathematical functions. A solitary wave structure still exists, but cannot be reached in a disclosed form.

=== Schamel equation with random coefficients ===
The fact that electrostatic trapping involves stochastic processes at resonance caused by chaotic particle trajectories has led to considering b in the S-equation as a stochastic quantity. This results in a Wick-type stochastic S-equation.

=== Time-fractional Schamel equation ===
A further generalization is obtained by replacing the first time derivative by a Riesz fractional derivative yielding a time-fractional S-equation. It has applications e.g. for the broadband electrostatic noise observed by the Viking satellite.

=== Schamel–Schrödinger equation ===
A connection between the Schamel equation and the nonlinear Schrödinger equation can be made within the context of a Madelung fluid. It results in the Schamel–Schrödinger equation.

$$i\phi_t +  |\phi|^{1/2}\phi + \phi_{xx} = 0$$

and has applications in fiber optics and laser physics.
