= Dispersive partial differential equation =

In mathematics, a dispersive partial differential equation or dispersive PDE is a partial differential equation that is dispersive. In this context, dispersion means that waves of different wavelength propagate at different phase velocities.

== Examples ==
=== Linear equations ===
- Euler–Bernoulli beam equation with time-dependent loading
- Airy equation
- Schrödinger equation
- Klein–Gordon equation

=== Nonlinear equations ===
- nonlinear Schrödinger equation
- Korteweg–de Vries equation (or KdV equation)
- Boussinesq equation (water waves)
- sine–Gordon equation

== See also ==
- Dispersion (optics)
- Dispersion (water waves)
- Dispersionless equation
