= Transversal =

Transversal may refer to:

- Transversal (combinatorics), a set containing exactly one member of each of several other sets
- Transversal (geometry), a line that intersects two or more lines at different points
- Transversal (instrument making), a technique for subdividing graduations
- Transversal Corporation, a software company
- Transversal plane, a geometric concept
- Transversal, relating to the transverse plane in anatomy

== See also ==
- Transverse (disambiguation)
