= Kawahara equation =

The Kawahara equation is a partial differential equation that arises in various fields of mathematical physics, particularly in the study of wave phenomena. Named after the Japanese mathematician T. Kawahara, who first introduced it in the context of fluid dynamics and nonlinear wave propagation, this equation extends the well-known Korteweg-de Vries (KdV) equation by incorporating higher-order derivatives. This inclusion allows for the modeling of more complex wave behaviors, capturing phenomena such as wave shape distortion and the emergence of solitary waves in dispersive systems.

The Kawahara equation is a fifth-order KdV equation and typically expressed as:

$\partial_t \phi + \alpha \phi \partial_x \phi+ \beta \partial_x^3\phi - \gamma\, \partial_x^5 \phi = 0,$

where waves described by function $\phi(x,t)$ and $\alpha,\,\beta$, and $\gamma > 0$ are constant.

== See also ==
- Fifth-order Korteweg–De Vries equation
