= Korteweg–de Vries–Burgers equation =

Nonlinear partial differential equation

The Korteweg–de Vries–Burgers equation is a nonlinear partial differential equation:

$$u_t+\alpha u_{xxx} + uu_x - \beta u_{xx}=0.$$

The equation gives a description for nonlinear waves in dispersive-dissipative media by combining the nonlinear and dispersive elements from the KdV equation with the dissipative element from Burgers' equation.

The modified KdV–Burgers equation can be written as:

$$u_t+ a u_{xxx} + u^2u_x - b u_{xx}=0.$$

== See also ==
- Burgers' equation
- Korteweg–de Vries equation
- modified KdV equation
