= Gardner equation =

Nonlinear partial differential equation

The Gardner equation is an integrable nonlinear partial differential equation introduced by the mathematician Clifford Gardner in 1968 to generalize KdV equation and modified KdV equation. The Gardner equation has applications in hydrodynamics, plasma physics and quantum field theory

$$\frac{\partial u}{\partial  t}-(6 \varepsilon^2 u^2 + 6u) \frac{\partial u}{\partial x }+\frac{\partial^3 u}{\partial  x^3}=0,$$

where $\varepsilon$ is an arbitrary real parameter.

== See also ==
- Korteweg–de Vries equation
