= Alan Weiss =

Alan Weiss may refer to:

- Alan Weiss (comics) (born 1948), American comic book artist
- Alan Weiss (musician) (born 1950), American musician
- Alan Weiss (mathematician) (born 1955), American mathematician and pioneer
- Alan Weiss (entrepreneur) (born 1946), American entrepreneur and author
