= Joseph Kruskal =

American mathematician

- Born: January 29, 1928; New York, New York, U.S.
- Died: September 19, 2010 (aged 82); Maplewood, New Jersey, U.S.
- Education: University of Chicago; Princeton University
- Known for: Multidimensional scaling Kruskal's algorithm Kruskal's tree theorem Kruskal–Katona theorem
- Relatives: Clyde Kruskal (nephew)
- Scientific career
- Workplaces: University of Michigan; Bell Labs
- Thesis: The Theory of Well-Partially-Ordered Sets (1954)
- Doctoral advisors: Roger Lyndon; Paul Erdős

Joseph Bernard Kruskal, Jr. (/ˈkrʌskəl/; January 29, 1928 – September 19, 2010) was an American mathematician.

== Personal life ==
Kruskal was born to a Jewish family in New York City to a successful fur wholesaler, Joseph B. Kruskal, Sr. His mother, Lillian Rose Vorhaus Kruskal Oppenheimer, became a promoter of origami during the early era of television.

Kruskal had two notable brothers, Martin David Kruskal, co-inventor of solitons, and William Kruskal, who developed the Kruskal–Wallis one-way analysis of variance. One of Joseph Kruskal's nephews is computer scientist and professor Clyde Kruskal.

== Education and career ==
He was a student at the University of Chicago earning a bachelor of science in mathematics in 1948, and a master of science in mathematics in the following year. After his time at the University of Chicago Kruskal attended Princeton University, where he completed his Ph.D. in 1954, nominally under Albert W. Tucker and Roger Lyndon, but de facto under Paul Erdős with whom he had two very short conversations. Kruskal worked on well-quasi-orderings and multidimensional scaling. He was a Fellow of the American Statistical Association, former president of the Psychometric Society, and former president of the Classification Society of North America. He also initiated and was first president of the Fair Housing Council of South Orange and Maplewood in 1963, and actively supported civil rights in several other organizations such as CORE.

He worked at Bell Labs from 1959 to 1993.

== Research ==
In statistics, Kruskal's most influential work is his seminal contribution to the formulation of multidimensional scaling. In computer science, his best known work is Kruskal's algorithm for computing the minimal spanning tree (MST) of a weighted graph. The algorithm first orders the edges by weight and then proceeds through the ordered list adding an edge to the partial MST provided that adding the new edge does not create a cycle. Minimal spanning trees have applications to the construction and pricing of communication networks. In combinatorics, he is known for Kruskal's tree theorem (1960), which is also interesting from a mathematical logic perspective since it can only be proved nonconstructively. Kruskal also applied his work in linguistics, in an experimental lexicostatistical study of Indo-European languages, together with the linguists Isidore Dyen and Paul Black. Their database is still widely used.

== Concepts named after Joseph Kruskal ==
- Kruskal's algorithm (1956)
- Kruskal's tree theorem (1960)
- Kruskal–Katona theorem (1963)
- Kruskal rank or k-rank (1977), closely related to the spark
