= Rudy Horne =

Mathematician of the African Diaspora (1968-2017)

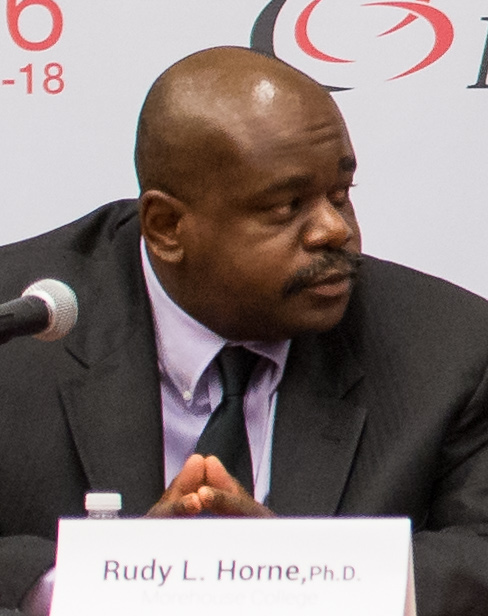
- Rudy L. Horne, photographed by Aubrey Gemignani in 2016
- Born: Rudy Lee Horne
- Education: Crete-Monee High School
- Alma mater: University of Colorado Boulder (PhD); University of Oklahoma
- Known for: Nonlinear optics Hidden Figures
- Scientific career
- Workplaces: Morehouse College; University of North Carolina at Chapel Hill; Florida State University; California State University, East Bay
- Thesis: Collision-Induced Timing Jitter and Four-Wave Mixing in Wavelength-Division Multiplexing Soliton Systems (2001)
- Doctoral advisor: Mark J. Ablowitz

Rudy Lee Horne (1968 – 2017) was an American mathematician and professor of mathematics at Morehouse College. He worked on dynamical systems, including nonlinear waves. He was the mathematics consultant for the film Hidden Figures.

== Early life and education ==
Horne grew up in the south side of Chicago. His father worked at Sherwin-Williams. He graduated from Crete-Monee High School. He completed a double degree in mathematics and physics at the University of Oklahoma in 1991. He joined the University of Colorado Boulder for his postgraduate studies, earning a master's in physics in 1994 and in mathematics in 1996. He completed his doctorate, Collision induced timing jitter and four-wave mixing in wavelength division multiplexing soliton systems, in 2001 which was supervised by Mark J. Ablowitz. He was the first African American to graduate from the University of Colorado Boulder Department of Applied Mathematics.

== Career and research ==
After completing his PhD, Horne had a position at the California State University, East Bay. before working as postdoctoral researcher at the University of North Carolina at Chapel Hill, with Chris Jones. Horne joined Florida State University in 2005. Horne joined Morehouse College in 2010 and was promoted to associate professor of mathematics in 2015. He continued to study four-wave mixing. His work considered nonlinear optical phenomena. He uncovered effects in parity-time symmetric systems.

Horne was recommended to serve as a mathematics consultant for Hidden Figures by Morehouse College. He worked closely with Theodore Melfi ensured the actors knew how to pronounce "Euler's". He spent four months working with 20th Century Fox. In particular, Horne worked with Taraji P. Henson on the mathematics she required for her role as Katherine Johnson. He taught the cast how to get excited by mathematics. His handwriting is on screen during a scene at the beginning of the film where Katherine Johnson solves a quadratic equation. He appeared on the interview series In the Know. Horne completed a Mathematical Association of America Maths Fest tour where he discussed the mathematics in Hidden Figures, focusing on the calculations that concerned Glenn's orbit around the Earth in 1962. He appeared on NPR's Closer Look.

He died on December 11, 2017, after surgery for a torn aorta. The University of Colorado Boulder established a Rudy Lee Horne Memorial Fellowship in his honour. He was described as a "rock star", inspiring generations of black students. He was awarded the National Association of Mathematicians (NAM) lifetime achievement award posthumously in 2018, and was recognized by Mathematically Gifted & Black as a Black History Month 2018 Honoree.
