= Dispersionless equation =

Dispersionless (or quasi-classical) limits of integrable partial differential equations (PDE) arise in various problems of mathematics and physics and have been intensively studied in recent literature (see e.g. references below). They typically arise when considering slowly modulated long waves of an integrable dispersive PDE system.

== Examples ==
=== Dispersionless KP equation ===
The dispersionless Kadomtsev–Petviashvili equation (dKPE), also known (up to an inessential linear change of variables) as the Khokhlov–Zabolotskaya equation, has the form

$$(u_t+uu_{x})_x+u_{yy}=0,\qquad (1)$$

It arises from the commutation

$$[L_1, L_2]=0.\qquad (2)$$

of the following pair of 1-parameter families of vector fields

$$L_1=\partial_y+\lambda\partial_x-u_x\partial_{\lambda},\qquad (3a)$$
$$L_2=\partial_t+(\lambda^2+u)\partial_x+(-\lambda u_x+u_y)\partial_{\lambda},\qquad (3b)$$

where $\lambda$ is a spectral parameter. The dKPE is the $x$-dispersionless limit of the celebrated Kadomtsev–Petviashvili equation, arising when considering long waves of that system. The dKPE, like many other (2+1)-dimensional integrable dispersionless systems, admits a (3+1)-dimensional generalization.

=== The Benney moment equations ===
The dispersionless KP system is closely related to the Benney moment hierarchy, each of which is a dispersionless integrable system:

$$A^n_{t_2} + A^{n+1}_x + n A^{n-1} A^0_x =0.$$

These arise as the consistency condition between

$$\lambda = p + \sum_{n=0}^\infty A^n/p^{n+1},$$

and the simplest two evolutions in the hierarchy are:

$$p_{t_2} + p p_x + A^0_x =0,$$
$$p_{t_3}  + p^2 p_x + (p A^0+A^1)_x = 0,$$

The dKP is recovered on setting

$$u = A^0,$$

and eliminating the other moments, as well as identifying $y=t_2$ and $t= t_3$.

If one sets $A^n = h v^n$, so that the countably many moments $A^n$ are expressed in terms of just two functions, the classical shallow water equations result:

$$h_y + (hv)_x=0,$$
$$v_y +v v_x + h_x=0.$$

These may also be derived from considering slowly modulated wave train solutions of the nonlinear Schrödinger equation. Such 'reductions', expressing the moments in terms of finitely many dependent variables, are described by the Gibbons-Tsarev equation.

=== Dispersionless Korteweg–de Vries equation ===
The dispersionless Korteweg–de Vries equation (dKdVE) reads as

$$u_{t_3}=uu_{x}.\qquad (4)$$

It is the dispersionless or quasiclassical limit of the Korteweg–de Vries equation. It is satisfied by $t_2$-independent solutions of the dKP system. It is also obtainable from the $t_3$-flow of the Benney hierarchy on setting

$$\lambda^2 = p^2 + 2A^0.$$

=== Dispersionless Novikov–Veselov equation ===
The dispersionless Novikov-Veselov equation is most commonly written as the following equation for a real-valued function $v=v(x_1,x_2,t)$:

$$\begin{align}
& \partial_{ t } v = \partial_{ z }( v w ) + \partial_{ \bar z }( v \bar w ), \\
& \partial_{ \bar z } w = - 3 \partial_{ z } v,
\end{align}$$

where the following standard notation of complex analysis is used: $\partial_{ z } = \frac{ 1 }{ 2 } ( \partial_{ x_1 } - i \partial_{ x_2 } )$, $\partial_{ \bar z } = \frac{ 1 }{ 2 } ( \partial_{ x_1 } + i \partial_{ x_2 } )$. The function $w$ here is an auxiliary function, defined uniquely from $v$ up to a holomorphic summand.

=== Multidimensional integrable dispersionless systems ===
See for systems with contact Lax pairs, and e.g., and references therein for other systems.

== See also ==
- Integrable systems
- Nonlinear Schrödinger equation
- Nonlinear systems
- Davey–Stewartson equation
- Dispersive partial differential equation
- Kadomtsev–Petviashvili equation
- Korteweg–de Vries equation
