= Nonlinear dispersion relation in Vlasov–Poisson plasmas =

Concept in physics and electrical engineering

In physics and electrical engineering, a nonlinear dispersion relation (NDR) is a dispersion relation that assigns the correct phase velocity $v_0$ to a nonlinear wave structure.

== Background ==
Plane electrostatic wave structures $\phi(x-v_0t)$ propagating with $v_0$ in a collisionless plasma exist in both natural and artificial settings, such as in the Earth's magnetosphere, in fusion reactors, or in a laboratory. Correct means that this must be done according to the governing equations, in this case the Vlasov-Poisson system, and the conditions prevailing in the plasma during the wave formation process. The particle trapping processes acting on the resonant electrons and ions requires phase space analyses. Since the latter is stochastic, transient and filamentary in nature, the dynamic trapping process eludes mathematical treatment, so that it can be adequately taken into account “only” in the asymptotic, quiet regime of wave generation, when the structure is close to equilibrium.

== Schamel method ==
The Schamel method is an alternative to the method described by Bernstein, Greene and Kruskal. In this method the Vlasov equations for the species involved are first solved and only in the second step Poisson's equation to ensure self-consistency. The Schamel method is generally preferred as it is more suited to describe the diversity of electrostatic structures, including their phase velocities. These structures are also known under Bernstein–Greene–Kruskal modes or phase space electron and ion holes, or double layers, respectively. In Schamel method, the distribution functions for electrons $f_e(x,v)=F_e(\epsilon_e,\sigma_e)$ and ions $f_i(x,u)=F_i(\epsilon_i,\sigma_i)$, which solve the corresponding time-independent Vlasov equation,

$(v\partial_x +\phi'(x)\partial_v)f_e(x,v)=0$ and $(u\partial_x -\theta\phi'(x)\partial_u)f_i(x,u)=0$, respectively,

are described as functions of the constants of motion. Thereby the unperturbed plasma conditions are adequately taken into account. Here $\epsilon_e=\frac{v^2}{2}-\phi$ and $\epsilon_i=\frac{u^2}{2}-\theta(\psi-\phi)$ are the single particle energies of electrons and ions, respectively ; $\sigma_e=\frac{v}{|v|}$ and $\sigma_i=\frac{u}{|u|}$ are the signs of the velocity of untrapped electrons and ions, respectively. Normalized quantities have been used, $\theta=\frac{T_e}{T_i}$ and it is assumed that $0 \le\phi \le\psi$, where $\psi$ is the amplitude of the structure.

Of particular interest is the range in phase space where particles are trapped in the potential wave trough. This area is (partially) filled via the stochastic particle dynamics during the previous creation process and is expressed and parameterized by so-called trapping scenarios.

In the second step, Poisson's equation, $\phi_{xx} = n_e - n_i=: - \mathcal {V} '(\phi;...)$, where $n_e,n_i$ are the corresponding densities obtained by velocity integration of $F_e(\epsilon_e,\sigma_e)$ and $F_i(\epsilon_i,\sigma_i)$, is integrated whereby the pseudo-potential $\mathcal{V}(\phi;...)$ is introduced. The result is $\frac{\phi_x^2}{2} + \mathcal{V(\phi;...)} = 0$, which represents the pseudo-energy. In $\mathcal{V}(\phi;...)$ the points stand for the different trapping parameters $B_s, D_{1s}, D_{2s}, C_s, s=e,i$. Integration of the pseudo-energy results in $x(\phi)= \int_\phi^\psi \frac{d\xi}{\sqrt{-2\mathcal{V}(\xi;...)}}$, which yields by inversion the desired $\phi(x)$. In these expressions the canonical form of $\mathcal{V}(\phi;...)$ is used already.

There are, however, two further trapping parameters $\Gamma_s,s=e,i$, which are missing in the canonical pseudo-potential. In its extended previous version $\mathcal{V}_0(\phi;...,\Gamma_e,\Gamma_i,v_0)$ they fell victim to the necessary constraint that the gradient of the potential $\phi(x)$ vanishes at its maximum. This requirement is

$\mathcal{V}_0(\psi;...,\Gamma_e,\Gamma_i,v_0)=0$

and leads to the term in question, the nonlinear dispersion relation (NDR). It allows the phase speed $v_0$ of the structure to be determined in terms of the other parameters and to eliminate $v_0$ from $\mathcal{V}_0(\phi;...,\Gamma_e,\Gamma_i,v_0)$ to obtain the canonical $\mathcal{V}(\phi;...)$. Due to the central role, the two expressions $\mathcal {V}(\phi;...)$ and $\mathcal {V}_0(\phi;...,\Gamma_e,\Gamma_i ,v_0)$ are playing, the Schamel method is sometimes also called Schamel's pseudo-potential method (SPP method). For more information, see references 1 and 2.

A typical example for the canonical pseudo-potential $\mathcal {V}(\phi;...)$ and the NDR is given by $-\mathcal{V}(\phi;B_e, B_i)/\psi^2=\frac{k_0^2}{2}\varphi(1-\varphi) +B_e\frac{\varphi^2}{2}(1-\sqrt\varphi) + B_i\frac{\theta^{3/2}}{2}(1 - (1-\varphi)^{5/2} - \frac{1}{2}\varphi(5-3\varphi))$

and by

$k_0^2 - \frac{1}{2}Z_r'(\frac{|v_D-v_0|}{\sqrt2}) - \frac{\theta}{2}Z_r'(\sqrt{\frac{\theta}{2\delta}}v_0)=B_e + \frac{3}{2}\theta^{3/2}B_i -\Gamma_e -\Gamma_i$

where $\varphi:=\phi/\psi$ and $\delta:=m_e/m_i$, respectively.

These expressions are valid for a current-carrying, thermal background plasma described by Maxwellians (with a drift $v_D$ between electrons and ions) and for the presence of the perturbative trapping scenarios $(\Gamma_s, B_s)$, s=e,i.

== In practice ==
A well known example is the Thumb-Teardrop dispersion relation, which is valid for single harmonic waves and is given as a simplified version of the NDR above with zero trapping parameters and a vanishing drift. It reads

$k_0^2 - \frac{1}{2}Z_r'(\frac{v_0}{\sqrt2}) - \frac{\theta}{2}Z_r'(\sqrt{\frac{\theta}{2\delta}}v_0)=0$.

It has been thoroughly discussed in but mistakenly as a linear dispersion relation.

Fig.1 The nonlinear dispersion relation of periodic cnoidal electron holes

A plot of $\omega_0:=k_0 v_0$ for a more general type of structures, the periodic cnoidal electron holes, is presented in Fig 1. for the case $B_e=B,B_i=0$ and immobile ions ($\theta=0$) showing the effect of the electron trapping parameter $B$ for positive and negative values.

Finally, it should be mentioned that an NDR has the nice property that it remains valid even if the potential $\phi(x)$ has an undisclosed form, i.e. can no longer be described by mathematically known functions.
