= Transverse =

Transverse may refer to:

- Transverse engine, an engine in which the crankshaft is oriented side-to-side relative to the wheels of the vehicle
- Transverse flute, a flute that is held horizontally
- Transverse force (or Euler force), the tangential force that is felt in reaction to any angular acceleration
- Transverse mass, a particle physics quantity
- Transverse plane, the plane orthogonal to the anteroposterior or oral-aboral axis
- Transverse rotors, a type of rotorcraft in which there are two rotors mounted side by side
- Transverse wave, a wave that causes a disturbance in the medium perpendicular to the direction it advances
- Transverse Island, an island on the east side of Stefansson Bay, off the coast of Enderby Land
- Transverse (album), a 2012 album by Carter Tutti Void

== See also ==
- Transversal (disambiguation)
- Transversality
