= Hirota–Satsuma equation =

The Hirota–Satsuma equation is a mathematical model of interactions of two long waves with different dispersion relations, expressed as a set of three coupled KdV equations:

$$\begin{cases} u_t-\frac{1}{2}u_{xxx}+3uu_x-3(vw)_x=0,\\
v_t+v_{xxx}-3uv_x=0,\\
w_t+w_{xxx}-3uw_x=0.\end{cases}$$

The Hirota–Satsuma equation appeared in the theory of shallow water waves, first discussed by Hirota, Ryogo and Satsuma, Junkichi in 1976. The equation has multiple soliton solutions and traveling wave solutions.
