= Donald MacCrimmon MacKay =

British physicist (1922–1987)

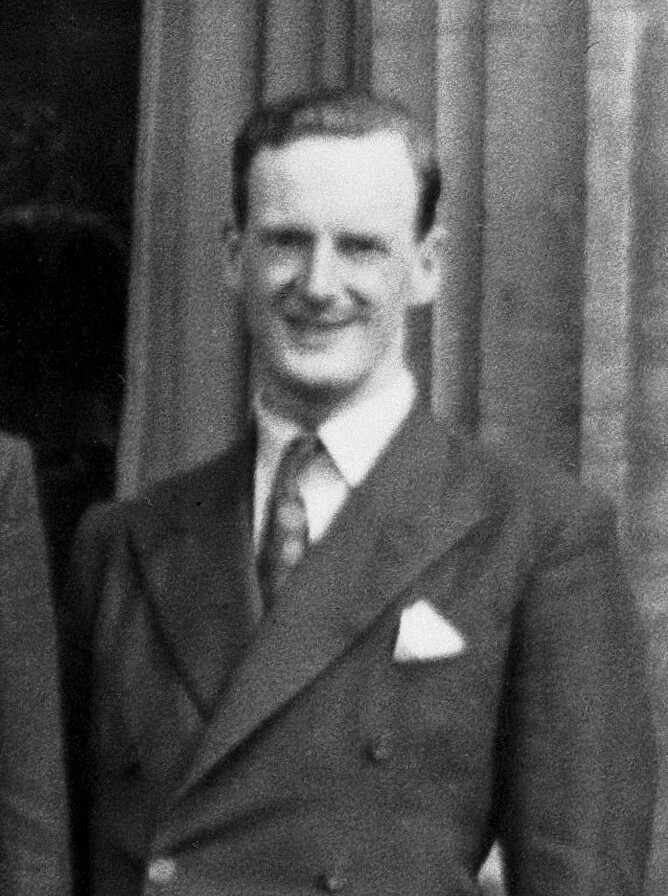
- Donald MacKay (1952)
- Born: 9 August 1922
- Died: 6 February 1987 (aged 64)
- Education: St Andrews University; King's College London
- Spouse: Valerie Wood
- Children: Robert Sinclair MacKay; David J. C. MacKay
- Scientific career
- Workplaces: Keele University

Donald MacCrimmon MacKay (9 August 1922 – 6 February 1987) was a British physicist, and professor at the Department of Communication and Neuroscience at Keele University in Staffordshire, England, known for his contributions to information theory and the theory of brain organisation.

== Education ==
MacKay was educated at Wick High School and St Andrews University, and gained a PhD at King's College London. In the late 1940s MacKay was among the first members of the Ratio Club.

== Personal life ==
Married to Valerie Wood, they had five children. His oldest son is Robert Sinclair MacKay, a professor of mathematics at the University of Warwick; his youngest son was David J. C. MacKay, a professor of physics at the University of Cambridge. He died within a year of giving the 1986 Gifford Lectures at the University of Glasgow.

== Quotes ==
In our age, when people look for explanations, the tendency more and more is to conceive of any and every situation that we are trying to understand by analogy with a machine.

God's way of working has been slow and gradual (the bodies of higher animals coming into being through descent with modification from earlier species), is all that is meant by the term 'evolution' as used in science. In this technical, scientific sense the idea is theologically neutral, and is widely accepted by biologists who are also biblical Christians. Nothing in the Bible rules it out.

== Selected publications ==
MacKay authored several publications. A selection:

- MacKay, Donald MacCrimmon, A high-speed electronic function generator, Nature 159 (4038): 406–407. 1947
- Deeley, E. M., MacKay, D. M., Multiplication and division by electronic analogue methods, Nature 163 (4147): 650-650. 1949
- MacKay, Donald MacCrimmon, Moving visual images produced by regular stationary pattern, Nature 180 : 849–850. 1957
- MacKay, Donald MacCrimmon, III. On the logical indeterminacy of a free choice., Mind, LXIX(273):31-40, 01 1960.
- MacKay, Donald MacCrimmon, Visual effects of non-redundant stimulation, Nature 192 (4804): 739–740. 1961
- MacKay, Donald MacCrimmon, and Michael Ellis Fisher. Analogue Computing at Ultra-High Speed: An Experimental and Theoretical Study. London: Chapman & Hall, 1962.
- MacKay, Donald MacCrimmon. Information, Mechanism, and Meaning. Cambridge: MIT Press. 1970.
- MacKay, Donald MacCrimmon. The Clockwork Image: A Christian Perspective on Science InterVarsity Press. 1974.
- MacKay, Donald MacCrimmon. Brains, Machines, and Persons. Collins, 1980.
- MacKay, Donald MacCrimmon, and Valerie Mackay (ed). Behind the Eye. Basil Blackwell, 1991.

About MacKay

- MacKay, Prof. Donald MacCrimmon, Who's Who 2009 online, Dec 2007
- "An I Behind the Eye: Donald MacKay's Gifford Lectures". PSCF. 44 (March 1992): 49–54.
- "Donald MacCrimmon MacKay (1922-1987): A View From the Other Side of the Atlantic". PSCF. 44 (March 1992): 55–61.
- "Science, Scientism and Christianity: The Ideas of D.M. MacKay". J. A. CRAMER. PSCF. 37 (September 1985): 142–148.
- Donald MacCrimmon MacKay Gifford Lectures bio
- "MacKay vs. Cramer: A Rebuttal". D. M. MacKay. PSCF. 38 (March 1986): 62–63.
- "Donald MacKay and Semi-materialism". Oliver R. Barclay. PSCF 43 (June 1991): 141–142.
- MacKay's JASA papers
- A comprehensive list of works by Donald MacCrimmon MacKay

== See also ==
- List of pioneers in computer science
