= Gibbons–Tsarev equation =

The Gibbons–Tsarev equation is an integrable second order nonlinear partial differential equation. In its simplest form, in two dimensions, it may be written as follows:

$$u_t u_{xt}-u_x u_{tt}+u_{xx}+1=0 \qquad (1)$$

The equation arises in the theory of dispersionless integrable systems, as the condition that solutions of the Benney moment equations may be parametrised by only finitely many of their dependent variables, in this case 2 of them. It was first introduced by John Gibbons and Serguei Tsarev in 1996, This system was also derived, as a condition that two quadratic Hamiltonians should have vanishing Poisson bracket.

== Relationship to families of slit maps ==
The theory of this equation was subsequently developed by Gibbons and Tsarev. In $N$ independent variables, one looks for solutions of the Benney hierarchy in which only $N$ of the moments $A^n$ are independent. The resulting system may always be put in Riemann invariant form. Taking the characteristic speeds to be $p_i$ and the corresponding Riemann invariants to be $\lambda_i$, they are related to the zeroth moment $A^0$ by:

$$\frac{\partial p_i}{\partial\lambda_j} = -\frac{ \frac{\partial A^0}{\partial \lambda_j}}{ p_i - p_j},\qquad (2a)$$
$$\frac{\partial A^0}{\partial \lambda_i \partial \lambda_j} = 2 \frac{ \frac{\partial A^0}{\partial \lambda_i} \frac{\partial A^0}{\lambda_j}}{(p_i-p_j)^2}.\qquad (2b)$$

Both these equations hold for all pairs $i\neq j$.

This system has solutions parametrised by N functions of a single variable. A class of these may be constructed in terms of N-parameter families of conformal maps from a fixed domain D, normally the complex half $p$-plane, to a similar domain in the $\lambda$-plane but with N slits. Each slit is taken along a fixed curve with one end fixed on the boundary of $D$ and one variable end point $\lambda_i$; the preimage of $\lambda_i$ is $p_i$. The system can then be understood as the consistency condition between the set of N Loewner equations describing the growth of each slit:

$$\frac{\partial p}{\partial\lambda_i} = -\frac{ \frac{\partial A^0}{\partial \lambda_j}}{ p - p_i}.\qquad (3)$$

== Analytic solution ==
An elementary family of solutions to the N-dimensional problem may be derived by setting:

$$\lambda^{N+1} = \prod_{i=0}^N (p-q_i),$$

where the real parameters $q_i$ satisfy:

$$\sum_{i=0}^N q_i =0.$$

The polynomial on the right hand side has N turning points, $p= p_i$, with corresponding $\lambda = \lambda_i$. With

$$A^0 = \frac{1}{N+1} \sum\sum_{i> j} q_i q_j,$$

the $p_i$and $A^0$ satisfy the N-dimensional Gibbons–Tsarev equations.
