= David Benney =

New Zealand applied mathematician

- Born: 8 April 1930; Wellington, New Zealand
- Died: 9 October 2015 (aged 85)
- Education: Victoria University College; University of Cambridge (BA); MIT (PhD)
- Known for: Benney moment equations
- Awards: Guggenheim Fellowship (1964)
- Scientific career
- Workplaces: Canterbury University College; MIT
- Thesis: On the secondary motion induced by oscillations in a shear flow (1959)
- Doctoral advisor: Chia-Chiao Lin
- Doctoral students: Alan C. Newell; Mark J. Ablowitz

David John Benney (8 April 1930 – 9 October 2015) was a New Zealand applied mathematician, known for work on the nonlinear partial differential equations of fluid dynamics.

== Education and early life ==
Born in Wellington, New Zealand, on 8 April 1930 to Cecil Henry (Matt) Benney and Phyllis Marjorie Jenkins, Benney was educated at Wellington College. He graduated BSc from Victoria University College in 1950, and MSc from the same institution in 1951. He then went to Emmanuel College, Cambridge, from where he graduated BA in the Mathematical Tripos in 1954. He was at Canterbury University College for two years as a lecturer, before taking leave of absence in August 1957 to undertake doctoral studies at Massachusetts Institute of Technology (MIT), graduating PhD in 1959.

== Career and research ==
Benney joined the mathematics faculty at MIT in 1960. He spent the rest of his career there, as a prolific researcher in fluid dynamics and supervisor of students, becoming emeritus professor. He received a Guggenheim Fellowship in 1964.
