= Leroy P. Steele Prize =

Awarded every year by the American Mathematical Society

The Leroy P. Steele Prizes are awarded every year since 1970 by the American Mathematical Society for distinguished research work and writing in the field of mathematics. Since 1993, the awards have been split into three categories: lifetime achievement, mathematical exposition, and research.

The prizes were begun from a bequest of Leroy P. Steele and were set up in honor of George David Birkhoff, William Fogg Osgood and William Caspar Graustein. The way the prizes are awarded was changed in 1976 and 1993, but the initial aim of honoring expository writing as well as research has been retained. The prizes—$10,000 for lifetime achievement, and $5,000 for mathematical exposition and for research—are not given on a strict national basis, but relate to writing in English (originally, or in translation) and mathematical activity in the United States.

== Steele Prize for Lifetime Achievement ==
- 2026 H. Blaine Lawson
- 2025 Dusa McDuff
- 2024 Haïm Brezis
- 2023 Nicholas M. Katz
- 2022 Richard P. Stanley
- 2021 Spencer Bloch
- 2020 Karen Uhlenbeck
- 2019 Jeff Cheeger
- 2018 Jean Bourgain
- 2017 James G. Arthur
- 2016 Barry Simon
- 2015 Victor Kac
- 2014 Phillip A. Griffiths
- 2013 Yakov G. Sinai
- 2012 Ivo M. Babuška
- 2011 John W. Milnor
- 2010 William Fulton
- 2009 Luis Caffarelli
- 2008 George Lusztig
- 2007 Henry P. McKean
- 2006 Frederick W. Gehring, Dennis P. Sullivan
- 2005 Israel M. Gelfand
- 2004 Cathleen Synge Morawetz
- 2003 Ronald Graham, Victor Guillemin
- 2002 Michael Artin, Elias Stein
- 2001 Harry Kesten
- 2000 Isadore M. Singer
- 1999 Richard V. Kadison
- 1998 Nathan Jacobson
- 1997 Ralph S. Phillips
- 1996 Goro Shimura
- 1995 John T. Tate
- 1994 Louis Nirenberg
- 1993 Eugene B. Dynkin

== Steele Prize for Mathematical Exposition ==
Year	Prizewinner	Citation
2026	Michael E. Taylor	for his fundamental treatise "Partial Differential Equations, Volumes I-III," published in 1996 as volumes 115-117 of Springer Verlag's Applied Mathematical Sciences series.
2025	James S. Milne	for his extensive corpus of excellent expository works provided on his website.
2024	Benson Farb and Dan Margalit	for their book A Primer on Mapping Class Groups.
2023	Lawrence C. Evans	for his book Partial Differential Equations.
2022	Aise Johan de Jong	for being the originator and maintainer of the Stacks Project.
2021	Noga Alon and Joel H. Spencer	for their book The Probabilistic Method.
2020	Martin R. Bridson and André Haefliger	for their book Metric Spaces of Non-Positive Curvature.
2019	Philippe Flajolet (posthumously) and Robert Sedgewick	for their book Analytic Combinatorics, an authoritative and highly accessible compendium of its subject, which demonstrates the deep interface between combinatorial mathematics and classical analysis.
2018	Martin Aigner and Günter M. Ziegler	for their book Proofs from THE BOOK.
2017	Dusa McDuff and Dietmar Salamon	for their book J-holomorphic Curves and Symplectic Topology.
2016	David A. Cox, John Little and Donal O'Shea	for their book Ideals, Varieties, and Algorithms, which has made algebraic geometry and computational commutative algebra accessible not just to mathematicians but to students and researchers in many fields.
2015	Robert Lazarsfeld	for his books Positivity in Algebraic Geometry I and II, published in 2004. These books were instant classics that have profoundly influenced and shaped research in algebraic geometry over the past decade.
2014	Yuri Burago, Dmitri Burago, Sergei Ivanov	for their book A Course in Metric Geometry, in recognition of excellence in exposition and promotion of fruitful ideas in geometry.
2013	John Guckenheimer, Philip Holmes	in recognition of their book Nonlinear Oscillations, Dynamical Systems, and Bifurcations of Vector Fields.
2012	Michael Aschbacher, Richard Lyons, Stephen D. Smith, Ronald Solomon	for their work The Classification of Finite Simple Groups: Groups of Characteristic 2 Type.
2011	Henryk Iwaniec	for his long record of excellent exposition, both in books and in classroom notes.
2010	David Eisenbud	for his book Commutative Algebra with a View Toward Algebraic Geometry.
2009	I. G. Macdonald	for his book Symmetric Functions and Hall Polynomials.
2008	Neil Trudinger	for his book Elliptic Partial Differential Equations of Second Order, written with the late David Gilbarg.
2007	David Mumford	for his beautiful expository accounts of a host of aspects of algebraic geometry, including The Red Book of Varieties and Schemes.
2006	Lars Hörmander	for his book The Analysis of Linear Partial Differential Operators.
2005	Branko Grünbaum	for his book Convex Polytopes.
2004	John Milnor	in recognition of a lifetime of expository contributions ranging across a wide spectrum of disciplines including topology, symmetric bilinear forms, characteristic classes, Morse theory, game theory, algebraic K-theory, iterated rational maps... and the list goes on.
2003	John B. Garnett	for his book Bounded Analytic Functions.
2002	Yitzhak Katznelson	for his book An Introduction to Harmonic Analysis.
2001	Richard Stanley	in recognition of the completion of his two-volume work Enumerative Combinatorics.
2000	John H. Conway	in recognition of his many expository contributions in automata, the theory of games, lattices, coding theory, group theory, and quadratic forms.
1999	Serge Lang	for his many mathematics books. Among Lang's most famous texts are Algebra and Algebraic Number Theory.
1998	Joseph H. Silverman	for his books The Arithmetic of Elliptic Curves and Advanced Topics in the Arithmetic of Elliptic Curves.
1997	Anthony W. Knapp	for his book Representation Theory of Semisimple Groups, a beautifully written book which starts from scratch but takes the reader far into a highly developed subject.
1996	Bruce Berndt	for the four volumes, Ramanujan's Notebooks, parts I, II, III, and IV.
1996	William Fulton	for his book Intersection Theory.
1995	Jean-Pierre Serre	for his 1970 book Cours d'Arithmétique, with its English translation, published in 1973 by Springer Verlag, A Course in Arithmetic.
1994	Ingrid Daubechies	for her book Ten Lectures on Wavelets.
1993	Walter Rudin	for his books Principles of Mathematical Analysis and Real and Complex Analysis.

== Steele Prize for Seminal Contribution to Research ==
Year	Prizewinner	Citation
2026	László Erdős, Benjamin Schlein, and Horng-Tzer Yau	for their three papers "Semicircle law on short scales and delocalization of eigenvectors for Wigner random matrices", "Local semicircle law and complete delocalization for Wigner random matrices", and "Universality of random matrices and local relaxation flow".
2025	Kenneth A. Ribet	for his paper "A modular construction of unramified p-extensions of Q(μ_{p})".
2024	József Balogh, Robert Morris, and Wojciech Samotij	for their paper "Independent sets in hypergraphs".
2024	David Saxton and Andrew Thomason	for their paper "Hypergraph containers".
2023	Peter B. Kronheimer and Tomasz S. Mrowka	for their paper "Gauge theory for embedded surfaces, I".
2022	Michel Goemans and David P. Williamson	for their paper "Improved approximation algorithms for maximum cut and satisfiability problems using semidefinite programming".
2021	Murray Gerstenhaber	for his two papers "The cohomology structure of an associative ring" and "On the deformation of rings and algebras".
2020	Craig Tracy and Harold Widom	for their paper "Level-spacing distributions and the Airy kernel".
2019	Haruzo Hida	for his highly original paper "Galois representations into $\operatorname{GL}_2(\Z_p[[X]])$ attached to ordinary cusp forms".
2018	Sergey Fomin, Andrei Zelevinsky	for their paper "Cluster algebras I: Foundations".
2017	Leon Simon	for his fundamental contributions to geometric analysis and, in particular, for his paper "Asymptotics for a class of non-linear evolution equations, with applications to geometric problems".
2016	Andrew Majda	for his monographs "The existence of multidimensional shock fronts" and "The stability of multidimensional shock fronts".
2015	Rostislav Grigorchuk	for his influential paper "Degrees of growth of finitely generated groups and the theory of invariant means", which appeared in Russian in 1984 and in English translation a year later. The paper stands as a landmark in the development of the now-burgeoning area of geometric group theory.
2014	Luis Caffarelli, Robert Kohn and Louis Nirenberg	for their paper "Partial regularity of suitable weak solutions of the Navier-Stokes equations".
2013	Saharon Shelah	for his book Classification Theory and the Number of Non-Isomorphic Models.
2012	William Thurston	for his contributions to low dimensional topology, and in particular for a series of highly original papers, starting with "Hyperbolic structures on 3-manifolds. I. Deformation of acylindrical manifolds", that revolutionized 3-manifold theory.
2011	Ingrid Daubechies	for her paper, "Orthonormal bases of compactly supported wavelets".
2010	Robert Griess	for his construction of the "monster" sporadic finite simple group, which he first announced in "A construction of F_{1} as automorphisms of a 196,883-dimensional algebra" with details published in "The friendly giant".
2009	Richard S. Hamilton	for his paper "Three-manifolds with positive Ricci curvature".
2008	Endre Szemerédi	for his paper "On sets of integers containing no k elements in arithmetic progression".
2007	Karen Uhlenbeck	for her foundational contributions in analytic aspects of mathematical gauge theory. These results appeared in the two papers "Removable singularities in Yang-Mills fields" and "Connections with L^{p} bounds on curvature".
2006	Clifford S. Gardner, John M. Greene, Martin D. Kruskal, Robert M. Miura	for their paper "Korteweg-deVries equation and generalizations. VI. Methods for exact solution".
2005	Robert P. Langlands	for his paper "Problems in the theory of automorphic forms". This is the paper that introduced what are now known as the Langlands conjectures.
2004	Lawrence C. Evans and Nicolai V. Krylov	for the "Evans-Krylov theorem" as established in the papers "Classical solutions of fully nonlinear convex, second order elliptic equations" and "Boundedly inhomogeneous elliptic and parabolic equations", first published in Russian then translated into English.
2003	Ronald Jensen and Michael Morley	to Ronald Jensen for his paper "The fine structure of the constructible hierarchy", and to Michael Morley for his paper "Categoricity in power".
2002	Mark Goresky and Robert MacPherson	for their papers "Intersection homology theory" and "Intersection homology II".
2001	Leslie F. Greengard and Vladimir Rokhlin	for their paper "A fast algorithm for particle simulations".
2000	Barry Mazur	for his paper "Modular curves and the Eisenstein ideal".
1999	Michael G. Crandall	for two seminal papers: "Viscosity solutions of Hamilton-Jacobi equations" (joint with Pierre-Louis Lions) and "Generation of semi-groups of nonlinear transformations on general Banach spaces" (joint with Thomas M. Liggett).
1999	John F. Nash	for his remarkable paper "The imbedding problem for Riemannian manifolds".
1998	Herbert Wilf and Doron Zeilberger	for their paper "Rational functions certify combinatorial identities".
1997	Mikhail Gromov	for his paper "Pseudo holomorphic curves in symplectic manifolds", which revolutionized the subject of symplectic geometry and topology and is central to much current research activity, including quantum cohomology and mirror symmetry.
1996	Daniel Stroock and S. R. Srinivasa Varadhan	for their four papers "Diffusion processes with continuous coefficients I, II", "On the support of diffusion processes with applications to the strong maximum principle", "Diffusion processes with boundary conditions", and their book Multidimensional Diffusion Processes.
1995	Edward Nelson	for the following two papers in mathematical physics characterized by leaders of the field as extremely innovative: "A quartic interaction in two dimensions" and "Construction of quantum fields from Markoff fields". In these papers he showed for the first time how to use the powerful tools of probability theory to attack the hard analytic questions of constructive quantum field theory, controlling renormalizations with $L^p$ estimates in the first paper, and in the second turning Euclidean quantum field theory into a subset of the theory of stochastic processes.
1994	Louis de Branges	for his proof of the Bieberbach conjecture.
1993	George Daniel Mostow	for his book Strong Rigidity of Locally Symmetric Spaces.

== Leroy P. Steele Prizes awarded prior to 1993 ==
Year	Prizewinner	Citation
1992	Jacques Dixmier	for his books Algèbres de von Neumann (von Neumann Algebras), Les C*-algèbres et leurs représentations (C*-Algebras and Their Representations), and Algèbres enveloppantes (Enveloping Algebras).
1992	James Glimm	for his paper "Solutions in the large for nonlinear hyperbolic systems of conservation laws".
1992	Peter Lax	for his numerous and fundamental contributions to the theory and applications of linear and nonlinear partial differential equations and functional analysis, for his leadership in the development of computational and applied mathematics, and for his extraordinary impact as a teacher.
1991	Jean-François Trèves	for Introduction to Pseudodifferential and Fourier Integral Operators, volumes I and II.
1991	Eugenio Calabi	for his fundamental work on global differential geometry, especially complex differential geometry.
1991	Armand Borel	for his extensive contributions in geometry and topology, the theory of Lie groups, their lattices and representations and the theory of automorphic forms, the theory of algebraic groups and their representations and extensive organizational and educational efforts to develop and disseminate modern mathematics.
1990	R. D. Richtmyer	for his book Difference Methods for Initial-Value Problems (second edition with K. W. Morton).
1990	Bertram Kostant	for his paper "On the existence and irreducibility of certain series of representations".
1990	Raoul Bott	for having been instrumental in changing the face of geometry and topology, with his incisive contributions to characteristic classes, K-theory, index theory, and many other tools of modern mathematics.
1989	Daniel Gorenstein	for his book Finite Simple Groups, An Introduction to Their Classification and his two survey articles "The classification of finite simple groups" and "Classifying the finite simple groups".
1989	Alberto Calderón	for his paper "Uniqueness in the Cauchy problem for partial differential equations".
1989	Irving Kaplansky	for his lasting impact on mathematics, particularly mathematics in America. By his energetic example, his enthusiastic exposition, and his overall generosity, he has made striking changes in mathematics and has inspired generations of younger mathematicians.
1988	Sigurður Helgason	for his books Differential Geometry and Symmetric Spaces, Differential Geometry, Lie Groups, and Symmetric Spaces, and Groups and Geometric Analysis.
1988	Gian-Carlo Rota	for his paper "On the foundations of combinatorial theory I. Theory of Möbius Functions".
1988	Deane Montgomery	for his lasting impact on mathematics, particularly mathematics in America. He is one of the founders of the modern theory of transformation groups and is particularly known for his contributions to the solution of Hilbert's fifth problem.
1987	Martin Gardner	for his many books and articles on mathematics and particularly for his column "Mathematical Games" in Scientific American.
1987	Herbert Federer and Wendell Fleming	for their pioneering paper "Normal and integral currents".
1987	Samuel Eilenberg	for his fundamental contributions to topology and algebra, in particular for his classic papers on singular homology and his work on axiomatic homology theory which had a profound influence on the development of algebraic topology.
1986	Donald E. Knuth	for his expository work, The Art of Computer Programming, 3 Volumes (1st Edition 1968, 2nd Edition 1973).
1986	Rudolf E. Kálmán	for his two fundamental papers, "A new approach to linear filtering and prediction problems" and "Mathematical description of linear dynamical systems", and for his contribution to a third paper, "New results in linear filtering and prediction theory" (with Richard S. Bucy).
1986	Saunders Mac Lane	for his many contributions to algebra and algebraic topology, and in particular for his pioneering work in homological and categorical algebra.
1985	Michael Spivak	for his five-volume set, "A Comprehensive Introduction to Differential Geometry" (second edition, Publish or Perish, 1979).
1985	Robert Steinberg	for three papers on various aspects of the theory of algebraic groups: "Representations of algebraic groups", "Regular elements of semisimple algebraic groups", and Endomorphisms of Linear Algebraic Groups.
1985	Hassler Whitney	for his fundamental work on geometric problems, particularly in the general theory of manifolds, in the study of differentiable functions on closed sets, in geometric integration theory, and in the geometry of the tangents to a singular analytic space.
1984	Elias M. Stein	for his book Singular Integrals and the Differentiability Properties of Functions.
1984	Lennart Carleson	for his papers "An interpolation problem for bounded analytic functions", "Interpolation by bounded analytic functions and the Corona problem", and "On convergence and growth of partial sums of Fourier series".
1984	Joseph L. Doob	for his fundamental work in establishing probability as a branch of mathematics and for his continuing profound influence on its development.
1983	Paul R. Halmos	for his many graduate texts in mathematics and for his articles on how to write, talk and publish mathematics.
1983	Stephen Cole Kleene	for three important papers which formed the basis for later developments in generalized recursion theory and descriptive set theory: "Arithmetical predicates and function quantifiers", "On the forms of the predicates in the theory of constructive ordinals (second paper)", and "Hierarchies of number-theoretic predicates".
1983	Shiing-Shen Chern	for the cumulative influence of his total mathematical work, high level of research over a period of time, particular influence on the development of the field of differential geometry, and influence on mathematics through Ph.D. students.
1982	Lars Ahlfors	for his expository work in Complex Analysis, and in Lectures on Quasiconformal Mappings and Conformal Invariants.
1982	Tsit Yuen Lam	for his expository work in his book Algebraic Theory of Quadratic Forms, and four of his papers: "K_{0} and K_{1} — an introduction to algebraic K-theory", Ten lectures on quadratic forms over fields (1977), Serre's Conjecture, and "The theory of ordered fields".
1982	John W. Milnor	for a paper of fundamental and lasting importance, "On manifolds homeomorphic to the 7-sphere".
1982	Fritz John	for the cumulative influence of his total mathematical work, high level of research over a period of time, particular influence on the development of a field, and influence on mathematics through Ph.D. students.
1981	Oscar Zariski	for his work in algebraic geometry, especially his fundamental contributions to the algebraic foundations of this subject.
1981	Eberhard Hopf	for three papers of fundamental and lasting importance: "Abzweigung einer periodischen Lösung von einer stationären Lösung eines Differential systems", "A mathematical example displaying features of turbulence" and "The partial differential equation u_{t} + uu_{x} = μ_{xx}".
1981	Nelson Dunford and Jacob T. Schwartz	for their three-volume expository book, Linear Operators.
1980	André Weil	for the total effect of his work on the general course of twentieth century mathematics, especially in the many areas in which he has made fundamental contributions.
1980	Harold M. Edwards	for mathematical exposition in his books Riemann's Zeta Function and Fermat's Last Theorem.
1980	Gerhard Hochschild	for his significant work in homological algebra and its applications.
1979	Antoni Zygmund	for his cumulative influence on the theory of Fourier series, real variables, and related areas of analysis.
1979	Robin Hartshorne	for his expository research article "Equivalence relations on algebraic cycles and subvarieties of small codimension" and his book Algebraic Geometry.
1979	Joseph J. Kohn	for his fundamental papers "Harmonic integrals on strongly pseudo-convex manifolds I, II".
1979	Salomon Bochner	for his cumulative influence on the fields of probability theory, Fourier analysis, several complex variables, and differential geometry.
1979	Hans Lewy	for three fundamental papers: "On the local character of the solutions of an atypical linear differential equation in three variables and a related theorem for regular functions of two complex variables", "An example of a smooth linear partial differential equation without solution", and "On hulls of holomorphy".
1975	George W. Mackey	for his paper "Ergodic theory and its significance for statistical mechanics and probability theory".
1975	H. Blaine Lawson	for his paper "Foliations".
1975	Lipman Bers	for his paper "Uniformization, moduli, and Kleinian groups".
1975	Martin Davis	for his paper "Hilbert's tenth problem is unsolvable".
1975	Joseph L. Taylor	for his paper Measure Algebras.
1972	Edward B. Curtis	for his paper "Simplicial homotopy theory".
1972	William J. Ellison	for his paper "Waring's problem".
1972	Lawrence E. Payne	for his paper "Isoperimetric inequalities and their applications".
1972	Dana S. Scott	for his paper "A proof of the independence of the continuum hypothesis".
1971	James B. Carrell	for his paper, written jointly with Jean Dieudonné, "Invariant theory, old and new".
1971	Jean Dieudonné	for his paper "Algebraic geometry" and for his paper, written jointly with James B. Carrell, "Invariant theory, old and new".
1971	Phillip A. Griffiths	for his paper "Periods of integrals on algebraic manifolds".
1970	Solomon Lefschetz	for his paper "A page of mathematical autobiography".

== See also ==
- List of mathematics awards
- List of awards named after people
