= Generalized Korteweg–De Vries equation =

Nonlinear partial differential equation

In mathematics, the generalized Korteweg–De Vries (gKdV) equation is a nonlinear partial differential equation that extends the classic Korteweg–De Vries equation (KdV equation). The KdV equation is a mathematical model for waves on shallow water surfaces; the generalized form allows for different types of nonlinearity, making it applicable to a wider range of physical phenomena.

The equation is written as:

$$\partial_t u + \partial_x^3 u + \partial_x f(u) = 0$$

Here, $u(x,t)$ represents the wave's amplitude as a function of position $x$ and time $t$. The function $f(u)$ describes the nonlinear effects. The original Korteweg–De Vries equation is the specific case where $f(u) = 3u^2$. A commonly studied form of the gKdV equation uses $f(u) = \frac{u^{k+1}}{k+1}$ for some positive integer $k$.
