= William J. Ellison =

British mathematician

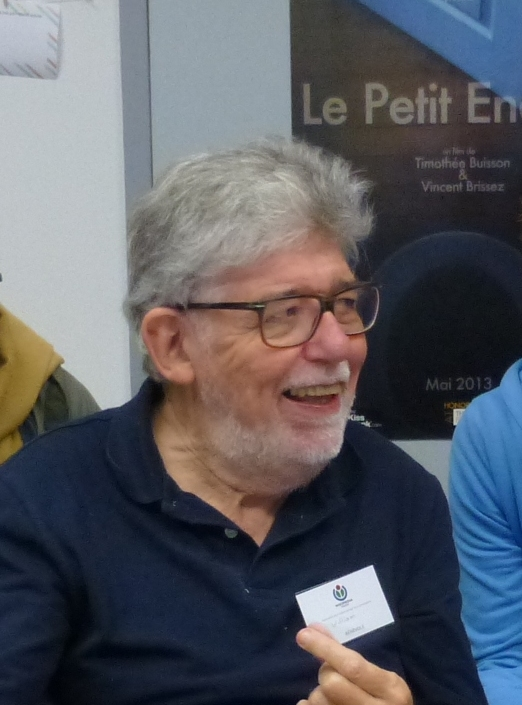
William John Ellison

William John Ellison (1943 - 16 March 2022) was a British mathematician who worked on number theory.

Ellison studied at the University of Cambridge, where he earned his bachelor's degree and then, after spending the academic year 1969/70 at the University of Michigan, his PhD in 1970 under John Cassels with thesis Waring's and Hilbert's 17th Problems. Subsequently, he became a postdoc at the University of Bordeaux. In 1972 he received the Leroy P. Steele Prize and a Lester Randolph Ford Award for his article "Waring's Problem“, an exposition of Waring's problem

== Selected works ==
- with Fern Ellison: Prime Numbers (Les nombres premiers, 1975). Wiley, New York 1985, ISBN 0-471-8265-3-7
- with Fern Ellison: Zahlentheorie In: Jean Dieudonné (ed.): Geschichte der Mathematik 1700 bis 1900 (Abrege d'histoire des mathematiques 1700–1900, 1978). Vieweg, Braunschweig 1985, online at archive.org, pp. 171–358, ISBN 3-528-08443-X
