= Robert Sinclair MacKay =

British mathematician

Robert MacKay FRS FInstP FIMA
- Born: Robert Sinclair MacKay; Carshalton, Surrey
- Education: University of Cambridge (BA); Princeton University (PhD)
- Awards: FRS (2000); FInstP (2000); FIMA (2003)
- Scientific career
- Workplaces: University of Warwick; Queen Mary University of London; Institut des Hautes Études Scientifiques
- Thesis: Renormalisation in area preserving maps (1982)
- Academic advisors: John M. Greene; Martin David Kruskal
- Website: homepages.warwick.ac.uk/~masfu/

Robert Sinclair MacKay FRS FInstP FIMA (born 1956) is a British mathematician and professor at the University of Warwick. He researches dynamical systems, the calculus of variations, Hamiltonian dynamics and applications to complex systems in physics, engineering, chemistry, biology and economics.

== Education ==
MacKay was educated at Newcastle High School, leaving in 1974. He completed his Bachelor of Arts degree with first class honours in mathematics at Trinity College, Cambridge in 1977, and completed Part III of the tripos with distinction in 1978. He obtained his PhD in astrophysical sciences in 1982 from the Plasma Physics Laboratory at Princeton University for research supervised by John M. Greene and Martin David Kruskal.

== Career and research ==
Between 1982 and 1995, MacKay held postdoctoral research positions at Queen Mary College, London, the Institut des Hautes Etudes Scientifiques, and the University of Warwick. From 1995 to 2000 he was Professor of Nonlinear Dynamics in the Department of Applied Mathematics and Theoretical Physics at the University of Cambridge, Director of the Nonlinear Centre, and Fellow of Trinity College. In 2000 he returned to Warwick as Professor of Mathematics and Director of Mathematical Interdisciplinary Research.

== Awards and honours ==
MacKay was awarded the Stefanos Pnevmatikos International Award in 1992. He was elected a Fellow of the Royal Society (FRS) in 2000. In 2012 he was elected President of the Institute of Mathematics and its Applications.

== Personal life ==
MacKay was born to Donald MacCrimmon MacKay and Valerie MacKay (née Wood) in 1956. His younger brother David J. C. MacKay FRS was the Regius Professor of Engineering at the University of Cambridge.
