= Kruskal–Katona theorem =

About the numbers of faces of different dimensions in an abstract simplicial complex

In algebraic combinatorics, the Kruskal–Katona theorem gives a complete characterization of the $f$-vectors of abstract simplicial complexes. It includes as a special case the Erdős–Ko–Rado theorem and can be restated in terms of uniform hypergraphs. It is named after Joseph Kruskal and Gyula O. H. Katona, but has been independently discovered by several others.

== Statement ==
Given two positive integers $N$ and $i$, there is a unique way to expand $N$ as a sum of binomial coefficients as follows:

$$N=\binom{n_i}{i}+\binom{n_{i-1}}{i-1}+\ldots+\binom{n_j}{j},\quad
n_i > n_{i-1} > \ldots > n_j \geq j\geq 1.$$

This expansion can be constructed by applying the greedy algorithm: set $n_i$ to be the maximal $n$ such that $N\geq \binom{n}{i},$ replace $N$ with the difference, $i$ with $i-1$, and repeat until the difference becomes zero. Define

$$N^{(i-1)}=\binom{n_i}{i-1}+\binom{n_{i-1}}{i-2}+\ldots+\binom{n_j}{j-1}.$$

=== Statement for simplicial complexes ===
An integral vector $(f_0, f_1, ..., f_{d-1})$ is the $f$-vector of some $(d-1)$-dimensional simplicial complex if and only if

$$0 \leq f_{i}^{(i)} \leq f_{i-1},\quad 1\leq i\leq d-1.$$

=== Statement for uniform hypergraphs ===
Let $A$ be a set consisting of $N$ distinct $i$-element subsets of a fixed set $U$ ("the universe") and $B$ be the set of all $(i-r)$-element subsets of the sets in $A$. Expand $N$ as above. Then the cardinality of $B$ is bounded below as follows:

$$|B| \geq  \binom{n_i}{i-r}+\binom{n_{i-1}}{i-r-1}+\ldots+\binom{n_j}{j-r}.$$

=== Lovász' simplified formulation ===
The following weaker but useful form is due to László Lovász (1993, 13.31b). Let $A$ be a set of $i$-element subsets of a fixed set $U$ ("the universe") and $B$ be the set of all $(i-r)$-element subsets of the sets in $A$. If $\textstyle\vert A\vert = \binom{x}{i}$ then $\textstyle\vert B\vert \geq \binom{x}{i-r}$.

In this formulation, $x$ need not be an integer. The value of the binomial expression is $\textstyle\binom{x}{i} = \frac{x(x-1)\dots(x-i+1)}{i!}$.

== Ingredients of the proof ==
For every positive $i$, list all $i$-element subsets $a_1<a_2<\dots a_i$ of the set $\mathbb{N}$ of natural numbers in the colexicographical order. For example, for $i=3$, the list begins

$$123, 124, 134, 234, 125, 135, 235, 145, 245, 345, \ldots.$$

Given a vector $f = (f_0, f_1, ..., f_{d-1})$ with positive integer components, let $\Delta_f$ be the subset of the power set $2^{\mathbb{N} }$ consisting of the empty set together with the first $f_{i-1}$ $i$-element subsets of $\mathbb{N}$ in the list for $i=1,\dots,d$. Then the following conditions are equivalent:

1. Vector $f$ is the $f$-vector of a simplicial complex $\Delta$.
2. $\Delta_f$ is a simplicial complex.
3. $f_{i}^{(i)} \leq f_{i-1}$ for $1\leq i\leq d-1$.

The difficult implication is 1 ⇒ 2.

== History ==
The theorem is named after Joseph Kruskal and Gyula O. H. Katona, who published it in 1963 and 1968 respectively. According to Le & Römer (2019), it was discovered independently by Kruskal (1963), Katona (1968), Marcel-Paul Schützenberger (1959), Harper (1966), and Clements & Lindström (1969). Donald Knuth (2011) writes that the earliest of these references, by Schützenberger, has an incomplete proof.

== See also ==
- Sperner's theorem
