= Regius Professor of Engineering (Cambridge) =

The Regius Professorship of Engineering is a professorship at the University of Cambridge, England, established in 2011. The Regius professorship was created by the University, with the permission of the Queen, to commemorate the end of the Duke of Edinburgh's 34-year tenure as Chancellor.

== Regius Professors of Engineering ==
- David J. C. MacKay (2013–2016)
- Steven Barrett (2024–present)
