= Dasher (software) =

Computer accessibility software

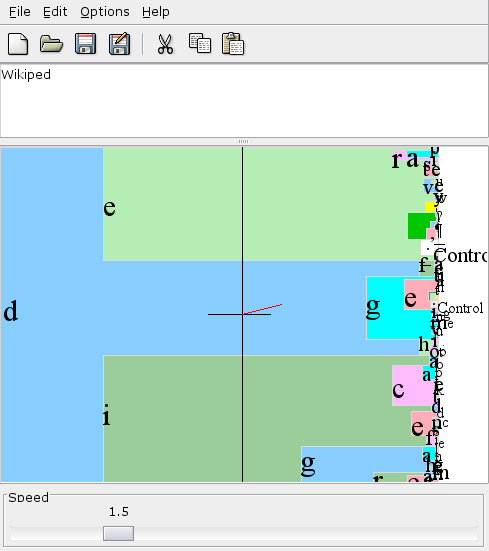
- Dasher running under Linux
- Developer: The Dasher Project
- Stable release: 4.11 / 14 March 2010; 16 years ago
- Preview release: 5.0 beta / 8 April 2016; 10 years ago
- Written in: Java, C and C++
- Operating system: Cross-platform
- Type: Computer accessibility
- License: GPL
- Website: dasher.at

Dasher is an input method and computer accessibility tool which enables users to compose text without using a keyboard, by entering text on a screen with a pointing device such as a mouse, touch screen, or mice operated by the foot or head. Such instruments could serve as prosthetic devices for disabled people who cannot use standard keyboards, or where the use of one is impractical.

Dasher is free and open-source software, subject to the requirements of the GNU General Public License (GPL), version 2. Dasher is available for operating systems with GTK+ support, i.e. Linux, BSDs and other Unix-like including macOS, Windows, Pocket PC, iOS and Android.

Dasher was invented by David J. C. MacKay and developed by David Ward and other members of MacKay's Cambridge research group. The Dasher project is supported by the Gatsby Charitable Foundation and by the EU aegis-project.

Dasher's code is currently maintained by the ACE Centre, and is being relicensed to the MIT License.

== Design ==
For whatever the writer intends to write, they select a letter from ones displayed on a screen by using a pointer, whereupon the system uses a probabilistic predictive model to anticipate the likely character combinations for the next piece of text, and accord these higher priority by displaying them more prominently than less likely letter combinations. This saves the user effort and time as they proceed to choose the next letter from those offered. The process of composing text in this way has been likened to an arcade game, as users zoom through characters that fly across the screen and select them in order to compose text. The system learns from experience which letter combinations are the most popular, and changes its display protocol over time to reflect this.

== Features ==
The Dasher package contains various architecture-independent data files:

- alphabet descriptions for over 150 languages
- letter colours settings
- training files in all supported languages
