= John M. Greene =

John Morgan Greene
- Born: September 22, 1928; Pittsburgh, Pennsylvania
- Died: October 22, 2007 (aged 79); San Diego, California
- Awards: James Clerk Maxwell Prize for Plasma Physics (1992); Steele Prize (1996)
- Scientific career
- Thesis: Higher-Order Corrections to the Nucleon-Nucleon Potential in Charge-Symmetric Pseudoscalar Theory (1956)
- Doctoral students: Robert Sinclair MacKay

John Morgan Greene (22 September 1928 – 22 October 2007) was an American theoretical physicist and applied mathematician, known for his work on solitons and plasma physics.

== Education ==
After several successes as a high school student in the state mathematical competitions of Kansas, he received a Pepsi Cola scholarship at Caltech, where he earned a B. S. in 1950. In 1956 he received a PhD from the University of Rochester in nuclear physics under David Feldman with a thesis entitled "High-Order Corrections to the Nucleon-Nucleon Potential in Change-Symmetric Pseudoscalar Theory."

== Career and research ==
After his PhD, he worked at the Princeton Plasma Physics Laboratory (on "Project Matterhorn"), where he was one of the leading theoretical physicists and remained until 1982. In 1982 he was Senior Technical Advisor in the theory group of General Atomics and simultaneously adjunct professor at the University of California, San Diego.

He was the author of a series of works with John Johnson and Katherine Weimer on equilibria and instabilities in Tokamak and Stellarator plasmas in magnetohydrodynamics. With Johnson and Ray Grimm he developed the computer program PEST (Princeton Equilibrium and Stability in Tokamak's Code). With Bruno Coppi and others he investigated dissipative instabilities in plasmas. With Ira B. Bernstein and Martin Kruskal he did research on BGK modes (nonlinear wave solutions in plasma physics). In the 1970s he worked on Hamiltonian dynamics in chaos theory. In 1979 he published Greene's criterion for the collapse of tori in KAM theory.

== Awards and honors ==
In 1992, he won the James Clerk Maxwell Prize for Plasma Physics. He was a fellow of the American Physical Society (APS) and a member of the American Geophysical Union.

In 2006, he received the Leroy P. Steele Prize with Martin Kruskal, Robert M. Miura and Clifford S. Gardner for his work on inverse scattering transformations in the theory of solitons.

== Personal life ==
He was married from 1956 on and had a daughter and two grandchildren. He died as a consequence of Parkinson's disease. Greene's father was a professor of chemical engineering at Kansas State.
