= David J. C. MacKay =

Regius Professor of Engineering at the University of Cambridge (1967–2016)

Sir David MacKay FRS FInstP FICE
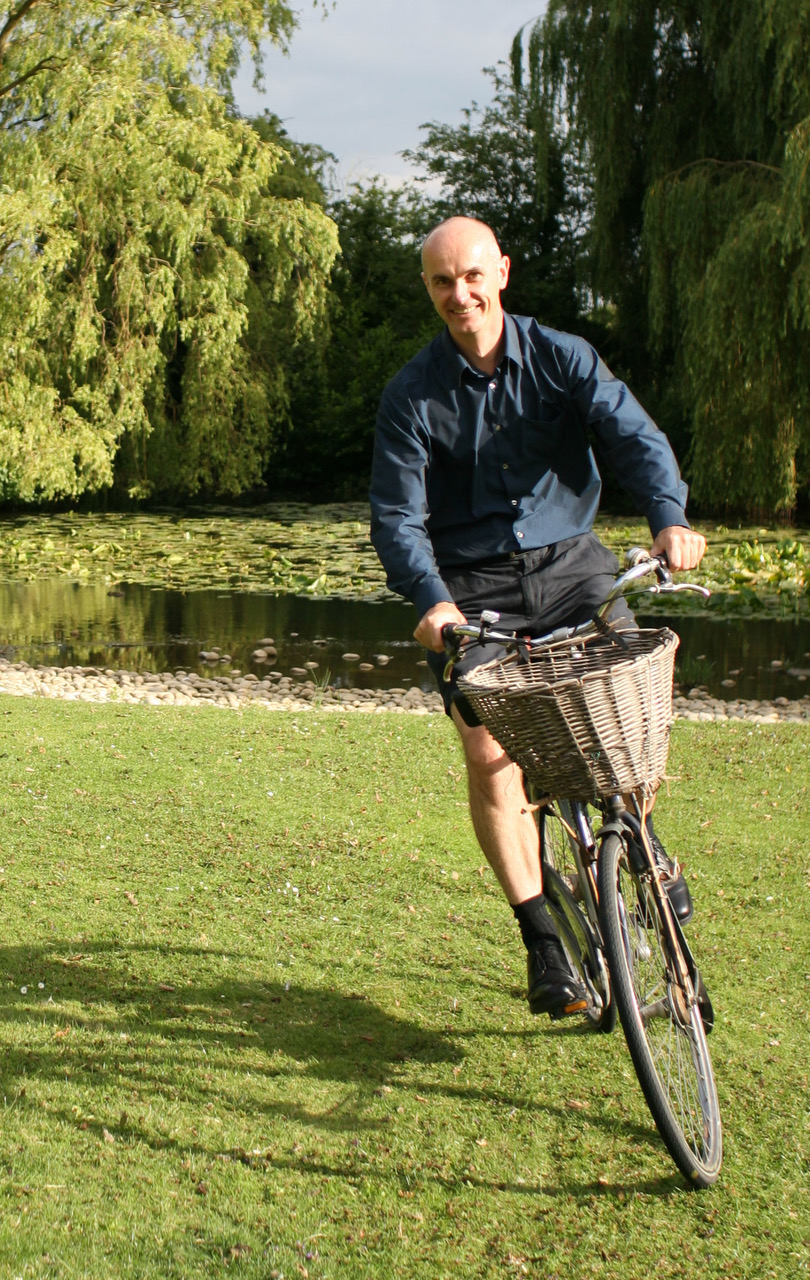
- Born: David John Cameron MacKay; 22 April 1967; Stoke-on-Trent, England
- Died: 14 April 2016 (aged 48); Cambridge, England
- Education: Trinity College, Cambridge (BA); California Institute of Technology (PhD)
- Known for: Sustainable Energy – Without the Hot Air; Low-density parity-check code; Dasher
- Spouse: Ramesh Ghiassi (m. 2011)
- Awards: FRS (2009); FInstP; FICE; Fulbright scholar; Knight Bachelor (2016)
- Scientific career
- Fields: Machine learning; Information theory; Sustainable energy
- Workplaces: University of Cambridge; California Institute of Technology; Department of Energy and Climate Change
- Thesis: Bayesian methods for adaptive models (1992)
- Doctoral advisor: John Hopfield
- Website: withouthotair.com www.inference.phy.cam.ac.uk/mackay gov.uk/government/people/david-mackay

Sir David John Cameron MacKay (22 April 1967 – 14 April 2016) was a British physicist, mathematician, and academic. He was the Regius Professor of Engineering in the Department of Engineering at the University of Cambridge and from 2009 to 2014 was Chief Scientific Advisor to the UK Department of Energy and Climate Change (DECC). MacKay wrote the book Sustainable Energy – Without the Hot Air.

== Education ==
MacKay was educated at Newcastle High School and represented Britain in the International Physics Olympiad in Yugoslavia in 1985, receiving the first prize for experimental work. He continued his education at Trinity College, Cambridge, and received a Bachelor of Arts degree in Natural Sciences (Experimental and theoretical physics) in 1988. He went to the California Institute of Technology (Caltech) as a Fulbright Scholar, where his supervisor was John Hopfield. He was awarded a PhD in 1992.

== Career and research ==
In January 1992 MacKay was appointed the Royal Society Smithson Research Fellow at Darwin College, Cambridge, continuing his cross-disciplinary research in the Cavendish Laboratory, the Department of Physics of the University of Cambridge. In 1995 he was made a University Lecturer in the Cavendish Laboratory. He was promoted in 1999 to a Readership, in 2003 to a Professorship in Natural Philosophy and in 2013 to the post of Regius Professorship of Engineering.

MacKay's contributions in machine learning and information theory include the development of Bayesian methods for neural networks, the rediscovery (with Radford M. Neal) of low-density parity-check codes, and the invention of Dasher, a software application for communication especially popular with those who cannot use a traditional keyboard. He cofounded the knowledge management company Transversal. In 2003, his book Information Theory, Inference, and Learning Algorithms was published.

His interests beyond research included the development of effective teaching methods and African development; he taught regularly at the African Institute for Mathematical Sciences in Cape Town from its foundation in 2003 to 2006. In 2008 he completed a book on energy consumption and energy production without fossil fuels called Sustainable Energy – Without the Hot Air. MacKay used £10,000 of his own money to publish the book, and the initial print run of 5,000 sold within days. The book received praise from The Economist, The Guardian, and Bill Gates, who called it "one of the best books on energy that has been written." Like his textbook on Information theory, MacKay made the book available for free online. In March 2012 he gave a TED talk on renewable energy.

MacKay was appointed to be Chief Scientific Advisor of the Department of Energy and Climate Change, United Kingdom, in September 2009. In October 2014, at the end of his five-year term, he was succeeded by John Loughhead.

=== Awards and honours ===
MacKay was elected a Fellow of the Royal Society (FRS) in 2009. His certificate of election reads:

David MacKay introduced more efficient types of error-correcting code that are now used in satellite communications, digital broadcasting and magnetic recording. He advanced the field of Machine Learning by providing a sound Bayesian foundation for artificial neural networks. Using this foundation, he significantly improved their performance, allowing them to be used for designing new types of steel that are now used in power stations. He used his expertise in information theory to design a widely used interface called "dasher" that allows disabled people to write efficiently using a single finger or head-mounted pointer."

In the 2016 New Year Honours, MacKay was appointed a Knight Bachelor "for services to scientific advice in government and science outreach".

== Personal life ==
David MacKay was born the fifth child of Donald MacCrimmon MacKay and Valerie MacKay. His elder brother Robert S. MacKay FRS (born in 1956) is Professor of Mathematics at the University of Warwick. David was a vegetarian.

He married Ramesh Ghiassi in 2011. They had a son and a daughter.

=== Illness and death ===
MacKay was diagnosed with inoperable stomach cancer (malignant adenocarcinoma) in July 2015, for which he underwent palliative chemotherapy, a process he documented in detail on his public personal blog. He died in the afternoon of 14 April 2016. He is survived by his wife and two children.
