= Martin David Kruskal =

American mathematician (1925-2006)

Martin Kruskal
- Born: Martin David Kruskal; September 28, 1925; New York City, New York, US
- Died: December 26, 2006 (aged 81); Princeton, New Jersey, US
- Citizenship: United States
- Education: New York University; University of Chicago
- Known for: Kruskal–Szekeres coordinates Kruskal–Shafranov instability Bernstein–Greene–Kruskal modes Kruskal–Schwarzchild instability Theory of solitons Kruskal count
- Awards: Heineman Prize (1983); National Medal of Science (1993); ForMemRS (1997); Steele Prize (2006)
- Scientific career
- Fields: Mathematical physics
- Workplaces: Rutgers University; Princeton University
- Doctoral advisor: Richard Courant
- Doctoral students: Robert Sinclair MacKay; Steven Orszag; Nalini Joshi

Martin David Kruskal (/ˈkrʌskəl/; September 28, 1925 – December 26, 2006) was an American mathematician and physicist. He made fundamental contributions in many areas of mathematics and science, ranging from plasma physics to general relativity and from nonlinear analysis to asymptotic analysis. His most celebrated contribution was in the theory of solitons.

He was a student at the University of Chicago and at New York University, where he completed his Ph.D. under Richard Courant in 1952. He spent much of his career at Princeton University, as a research scientist at the Plasma Physics Laboratory starting in 1951, and then as a professor of astronomy (1961), founder and chair of the Program in Applied and Computational Mathematics (1968), and professor of mathematics (1979). He retired from Princeton University in 1989 and joined the mathematics department of Rutgers University, holding the David Hilbert Chair of Mathematics.

Apart from serious mathematical work, Kruskal was known for mathematical diversions. For example, he invented the Kruskal count, a magical effect that has been known to perplex professional magicians because it was based not on sleight of hand but on a mathematical phenomenon.

== Personal life ==
Martin David Kruskal was born to a Jewish family in New York City and grew up in New Rochelle. He was generally known as Martin to the world and David to his family. His father, Joseph B. Kruskal Sr., was a successful fur wholesaler. His mother, Lillian Rose Vorhaus Kruskal Oppenheimer, became a noted promoter of the art of origami during the early era of television and founded the Origami Center of America in New York City, which later became OrigamiUSA. He was one of five children. His two brothers, both eminent mathematicians, were Joseph Kruskal (1928–2010; discoverer of multidimensional scaling, the Kruskal tree theorem, and Kruskal's algorithm) and William Kruskal (1919–2005; discoverer of the Kruskal–Wallis test).

Martin Kruskal's wife, Laura Kruskal, was a lecturer and writer about origami and originator of many new models. They were married for 56 years. Martin Kruskal also invented several origami models including an envelope for sending secret messages. The envelope could be easily unfolded, but it could not then be easily refolded to conceal the deed. Their three children are Karen (an attorney), Kerry (an author of children's books), and Clyde, a computer scientist.

== Research ==
Martin Kruskal's scientific interests covered a wide range of topics in pure mathematics and applications of mathematics to the sciences. He had lifelong interests in many topics in partial differential equations and nonlinear analysis and developed fundamental ideas about asymptotic expansions, adiabatic invariants, and numerous related topics.

Early Work

His Ph.D. dissertation, written under the direction of Richard Courant and Bernard Friedman at New York University, was on the topic "The Bridge Theorem For Minimal Surfaces". He received his Ph.D. in 1952.

In the 1950s and early 1960s, he worked largely on plasma physics, developing many ideas that are now fundamental in the field. His theory of adiabatic invariants was important in fusion research. Important concepts of plasma physics that bear his name include the Kruskal–Shafranov instability and the Bernstein–Greene–Kruskal (BGK) modes. With I. B. Bernstein, E. A. Frieman, and R. M. Kulsrud, he developed the MHD (or magnetohydrodynamic) Energy Principle. His interests extended to plasma astrophysics as well as laboratory plasmas.

Black Holes

In 1960, Kruskal discovered the full classical spacetime structure of the simplest type of black hole in general relativity. A spherically symmetric spacetime can be described by the Schwarzschild solution, which was discovered in the early days of general relativity. However, in its original form, this solution only describes the region exterior to the event horizon of the black hole. Kruskal (in parallel with George Szekeres) discovered the maximal analytic continuation of the Schwarzschild solution, which he exhibited elegantly using what are now called Kruskal–Szekeres coordinates.

This led Kruskal to the astonishing discovery that the interior of the black hole looks like a "wormhole" connecting two identical, asymptotically flat universes. This was the first real example of a wormhole solution in general relativity. The wormhole collapses to a singularity before any observer or signal can travel from one universe to the other. This is now believed to be the general fate of wormholes in general relativity. In the 1970s, when the thermal nature of black hole physics was discovered, the wormhole property of the Schwarzschild solution turned out to be an important ingredient. Nowadays, it is considered a fundamental clue in attempts to understand quantum gravity.

The Inverse Scattering Method

Kruskal's most widely known work was the discovery in the 1960s of the integrability of certain nonlinear partial differential equations involving functions of one spatial variable as well as time. These developments began with a pioneering computer simulation by Kruskal and Norman Zabusky (with some assistance from Harry Dym) of a nonlinear equation known as the Korteweg–de Vries equation (KdV). The KdV equation is an asymptotic model of the propagation of nonlinear dispersive waves. But Kruskal and Zabusky made the startling discovery of a "solitary wave" solution of the KdV equation that propagates non-dispersively and even regains its shape after a collision with other such waves. Because of the particle-like properties of such a wave, they named it a "soliton", a term that caught on almost immediately.

This work was partly motivated by the near-recurrence paradox that had been observed in a very early computer simulation of a certain nonlinear lattice by Enrico Fermi, John Pasta, Stanislaw Ulam and Mary Tsingou at Los Alamos in 1955. Those authors had observed long-time nearly recurrent behavior of a one-dimensional chain of anharmonic oscillators, in contrast to the rapid thermalization that had been expected. Kruskal and Zabusky simulated the KdV equation, which Kruskal had obtained as a continuum limit of that one-dimensional chain, and found solitonic behavior, which is the opposite of thermalization. That turned out to be the heart of the phenomenon.

Solitary wave phenomena had been a 19th-century mystery dating back to work by John Scott Russell who, in 1834, observed what we now call a soliton, propagating in a canal, and chased it on horseback. In spite of his observations of solitons in wave tank experiments, Scott Russell never recognized them as such, because of his focus on the "great wave of translation," the largest amplitude solitary wave. His experimental observations, presented in his Report on Waves to the British Association for the Advancement of Science in 1844, were viewed with skepticism by George Airy and George Stokes because their linear water wave theories were unable to explain them. Joseph Boussinesq (1871) and Lord Rayleigh (1876) published mathematical theories justifying Scott Russell's observations. In 1895, Diederik Korteweg and Gustav de Vries formulated the KdV equation to describe shallow water waves (such as the waves in the canal observed by Russell), but the essential properties of this equation were not understood until the work of Kruskal and his collaborators in the 1960s.

Solitonic behavior suggested that the KdV equation must have conservation laws beyond the obvious conservation laws of mass, energy, and momentum. A fourth conservation law was discovered by Gerald Whitham and a fifth one by Kruskal and Zabusky. Several new conservation laws were discovered by hand by Robert Miura, who also showed that many conservation laws existed for a related equation known as the Modified Korteweg–de Vries (MKdV) equation. With these conservation laws, Miura showed a connection (called the Miura transformation) between solutions of the KdV and MKdV equations. This was a clue that enabled Kruskal, with Clifford S. Gardner, John M. Greene, and Miura (GGKM), to discover a general technique for exact solution of the KdV equation and understanding of its conservation laws. This was the inverse scattering method, a surprising and elegant method that demonstrates that the KdV equation admits an infinite number of Poisson-commuting conserved quantities and is completely integrable. This discovery gave the modern basis for understanding of the soliton phenomenon: the solitary wave is recreated in the outgoing state because this is the only way to satisfy all of the conservation laws. Soon after GGKM, Peter Lax famously interpreted the inverse scattering method in terms of isospectral deformations and Lax pairs.

The inverse scattering method has had an astonishing variety of generalizations and applications in different areas of mathematics and physics. Kruskal himself pioneered some of the generalizations, such as the existence of infinitely many conserved quantities for the sine-Gordon equation. This led to the discovery of an inverse scattering method for that equation by M. J. Ablowitz, D. J. Kaup, A. C. Newell, and H. Segur (AKNS). The sine-Gordon equation is a relativistic wave equation in 1+1 dimensions that also exhibits the soliton phenomenon and which became an important model of solvable relativistic field theory. In seminal work preceding AKNS, Zakharov and Shabat discovered an inverse scattering method for the nonlinear Schrödinger equation.

Solitons are now known to be ubiquitous in nature, from physics to biology.

Later Contributions

In the 1980s, Kruskal developed an acute interest in the Painlevé equations. They frequently arise as symmetry reductions of soliton equations, and Kruskal was intrigued by the intimate relationship that appeared to exist between the properties characterizing these equations and completely integrable systems. Much of his subsequent research was driven by a desire to understand this relationship and to develop new direct and simple methods for studying the Painlevé equations. Kruskal was rarely satisfied with the standard approaches to differential equations.

The six Painlevé equations have a characteristic property called the Painlevé property: their solutions are single-valued around all singularities whose locations depend on the initial conditions. In Kruskal's opinion, since this property defines the Painlevé equations, one should be able to start with this, without any additional unnecessary structures, to work out all the required information about their solutions. The first result was an asymptotic study of the Painlevé equations with Nalini Joshi, unusual at the time in that it did not require the use of associated linear problems. His persistent questioning of classical results led to a direct and simple method, also developed with Joshi, to prove the Painlevé property of the Painlevé equations.

In the later part of his career, one of Kruskal's chief interests was the theory of surreal numbers. Surreal numbers, which are defined constructively, have all the basic properties and operations of the real numbers. They include the real numbers alongside many types of infinities and infinitesimals. Kruskal contributed to the foundation of the theory, to defining surreal functions, and to analyzing their structure. He discovered a remarkable link between surreal numbers, asymptotics, and exponential asymptotics. A major open question, raised by Conway, Kruskal and Norton in the late 1970s, and investigated by Kruskal with great tenacity, is whether sufficiently well behaved surreal functions possess definite integrals. This question was answered negatively in the full generality, for which Conway et al. had hoped, by Costin, Friedman and Ehrlich in 2015. However, the analysis of Costin et al. shows that definite integrals do exist for a sufficiently broad class of surreal functions for which Kruskal's vision of asymptotic analysis, broadly conceived, goes through. At the time of his death, Kruskal was in the process of writing a book on surreal analysis with O. Costin.

Kruskal coined the term asymptotology to describe the "art of dealing with applied mathematical systems in limiting cases". He formulated seven Principles of Asymptotology: 1. The Principle of Simplification; 2. The Principle of Recursion; 3. The Principle of Interpretation; 4. The Principle of Wild Behaviour; 5. The Principle of Annihilation; 6. The Principle of Maximal Balance; 7. The Principle of Mathematical Nonsense.

The term asymptotology is not so widely used as the term soliton. Asymptotic methods of various types have been successfully used since almost the birth of science itself. Nevertheless, Kruskal tried to show that asymptotology is a special branch of knowledge, intermediate, in some sense, between science and art. His proposal has been found to be very fruitful.

Recognition

Kruskal's contributions have been widely recognized. In 1986, Kruskal and Zabusky shared the Howard N. Potts Gold Medal from the Franklin Institute "for contributions to mathematical physics and early creative combinations of analysis and computation, but most especially for seminal work in the properties of solitons". In awarding the 2006 Steele Prize to Gardner, Greene, Kruskal, and Miura, the American Mathematical Society stated that before their work "there was no general theory for the exact solution of any important class of nonlinear differential equations". The AMS added, "In applications of mathematics, solitons and their descendants (kinks, anti-kinks, instantons, and breathers) have entered and changed such diverse fields as nonlinear optics, plasma physics, and ocean, atmospheric, and planetary sciences. Nonlinearity has undergone a revolution: from a nuisance to be eliminated, to a new tool to be exploited."

Kruskal received the National Medal of Science in 1993 "for his influence as a leader in nonlinear science for more than two decades as the principal architect of the theory of soliton solutions of nonlinear equations of evolution".

In an article surveying the state of mathematics at the turn of the millennium, the eminent mathematician Philip A. Griffiths wrote that the discovery of integrability of the KdV equation "exhibited in the most beautiful way the unity of mathematics. It involved developments in computation, and in mathematical analysis, which is the traditional way to study differential equations. It turns out that one can understand the solutions to these differential equations through certain very elegant constructions in algebraic geometry. The solutions are also intimately related to representation theory, in that these equations turn out to have an infinite number of hidden symmetries. Finally, they relate back to problems in elementary geometry."

== Awards and honors ==
Kruskal's honors and awards included:

- Gibbs Lecturer, American Mathematical Society (1979);
- Dannie Heineman Prize, American Physical Society (1983);
- Howard N. Potts Gold Medal, Franklin Institute (1986);
- Award in Applied Mathematics and Numerical Analysis, National Academy of Sciences (1989);
- National Medal Of Science (1993);
- John von Neumann Lectureship, SIAM (1994);
- Honorary DSc, Heriot–Watt University (2000);
- Maxwell Prize, Council For Industrial And Applied Mathematics (2003);
- Steele Prize, American Mathematical Society (2006)
- Member of the National Academy of Sciences (1980) and the American Academy of Arts and Sciences (1983)
- Elected a Foreign Member of the Royal Society (ForMemRS) in 1997
- Elected Foreign Member of the Russian Academy of Sciences(2000)
- Elected a Fellow of the Royal Society of Edinburgh (2001)

== See also ==
- Kruskal count in recreational mathematics
