= Transversal Corporation =

- Company type: Private
- Industry: Computer software
- Founded: 1998
- Founder: Davin Yap, David MacKay
- Headquarters: Cambridge, United Kingdom
- Area served: International
- Website: www.transversal.com

Transversal Corporation is a British software company specializing in cloud-based knowledge management.

== History ==
Transversal was founded in 1998 by Davin Yap and David MacKay, researchers at the University of Cambridge, to develop a business application for answering customers' questions. Yap served as CEO until 2003 and again from 2005 to 2014, when he was replaced by company executive Heather Richards.

In 2007, Transversal was named one of the UK's 20 fastest-growing venture companies. During the 2010s it broadened its geographical reach by opening offices in Australia, Germany and the United States.

In 2019, Transversal was acquired by Verint Systems.

== Products and services ==
Transversal provides knowledge management software for customer-facing websites, contact centers and enterprise systems. It offers an end-to-end implementation service (including consultancy and design), as well as an API to enable its technology to be integrated with existing platforms.

== Awards and recognition ==
Transversal and its clients won the Contact Centre Association's award for Best Technology Partnership in 2008, 2009 and 2010. In 2014, Transversal was a top-ten finalist in the SME category at the Digital Leaders awards and a finalist in the Technology Services Industry Association's Vision Awards. KMWorld named Transversal among its vendors of "trend-setting products" from 2014 through 2018, and listed Transversal as one of the "100 companies that matter in knowledge management" from 2015 through 2019. In 2018, Transversal's CEO Heather Richards was named Cambridge Judge Business School Woman Entrepreneur of the Year.
