= Clifford S. Gardner =

American mathematician

Clifford Spear Gardner (January 14, 1924 – September 25, 2013) was an American mathematician specializing in applied mathematics.

== Career ==
Gardner studied at Phillips Academy and Harvard, where he earned his baccalaureate in 1944. In 1953 he earned a PhD from New York University, under the supervision of Fritz John. Thereafter he worked at NASA in Langley Field, the Courant Institute of Mathematical Sciences of NYU, Lawrence Livermore National Laboratory and the Princeton Plasma Physics Laboratory. He was a mathematics professor at the University of Texas at Austin from 1967 to 1990, when he retired as professor emeritus.

In 1985 he won the Norbert Wiener Prize for his contributions to supersonic aerodynamics and plasma physics. In 2006 he received with Martin Kruskal, Robert M. Miura, and John M. Greene the Leroy P. Steele Prize for their work on the inverse scattering transformation method for the solution of nonlinear differential equations (special soliton modeling equations similar to the Korteweg–De Vries equation). They developed a systematic approach to solving many nonlinear partial differential equations in a way similar to Fourier analysis for linear PDEs.

Gardner died September 25, 2013, in Austin, Texas.
