= Alan Weiss (mathematician) =

American mathematician

Alan Weiss (born December 5, 1955) is an American mathematician, a pioneer in the usage of large deviations theory in performance evaluation and related areas.

Weiss received his B.Sc. in mathematics and physics from Case Western Reserve University taking courses from Lajos Takács and being advised by Arthur J. Lohwater (1976). He received his M.Sc. in mathematics from Courant Institute (1979) and Ph.D. from New York University in 1981; his advisor was S. R. S. Varadhan, and his dissertation was entitled Invariant Measures of Diffusion Processes on Domains with Boundaries. He worked at Bell Labs (1981-2007), before joining MathWorks of Natick. Weiss had appointments with University of Maryland, College Park (1986), Columbia University (1993) and Drew University (2005).

== Books ==
- Large Deviations for Performance Analysis (Chapman & Hall, 1995). Coauthored with Adam Shwartz.

== Publications ==
- Digital Adaptive Filters: Conditions for Convergence, Rates of Convergence, Effects of Noise and Errors Arising from the Implementation, in IEEE Trans. on Information Theory, 25(6):637-652, 1979. With Debasis Mitra
- Allocating Independent Substaks on Parallel Processors, IEEE Trans. Softw. Eng., 11(10):1001-1016, 1985. With Clyde Kruskal.
- A Lower Bound for Probabilistic Algorithms for Finite State Machines, in Jnr. Comp. and Systems Sci., 33(1):88-105, 1986. With Albert Greenberg
