= Bernstein–Greene–Kruskal modes =

Type of nonlinear electrostatic waves

Bernstein–Greene–Kruskal modes (a.k.a. BGK modes) are nonlinear electrostatic waves that propagate in a collisionless plasma. They are nonlinear solutions to the Vlasov-Poisson system of equations in plasma physics, and are named after physicists Ira B. Bernstein, John M. Greene, and Martin D. Kruskal, who solved and published the exact solution for the one-dimensional unmagnetized case in 1957.

BGK modes have been studied extensively in numerical simulations for two- and three-dimensional cases, and are believed to be produced by the two-stream instability. They have been observed as electron phase space holes (electrostatic solitary structures) and double layers in space plasmas, as well as in scattering experiments in the laboratory.

== Small-amplitude limit: Van Kampen modes? ==
It is generally claimed that in the linear limit BGK modes (e.g. in the small amplitude approximation) reduce to what is known as Van Kampen modes, named after Nico van Kampen who derived the solutions in 1955.

This is wrong, however, since such a transition from a nonlinear to a linear mode does not take place even in the infinitesimal amplitude limit. A harmonic hole equilibrium of the Vlasov-Poisson system, which is correctly described as a complete solution, i.e. inclusively its phase velocity, by the Schamel method, shows that nonlinearity persists even in the small amplitude limit. The area of trapped particles in the phase space never vanishes in this limit and there is no moment in which the distribution of trapped particles is transformed (or collapses) into a delta-function. Another indication that this claim is unfounded is that nonlinear single modes prove to be unconditionally marginal stable in current-carrying plasmas regardless of the drift velocity between electrons and ions. Landau's theory, as a linear wave theory, is obviously not applicable in case of coherent waves such as BGK modes valid even in the harmonic single wave limit. The advantage of the Schamel method over the BGK method, including the unlimited class of so-called undisclosed modes not covered by the BGK method, is discussed in and.

== Quantum BGK (QBGK) modes ==
BGK modes have been generalized to quantum mechanics, in which the solutions (called quantum BGK modes) solve the quantum equivalent of the Vlasov–Poisson system known as the Wigner–Poisson system, with periodic boundary conditions. The solutions for the QBGK modes were put forth by Lange et al. in 1996, with potential applications to quantum plasmas. Classical and quantum BGK modes as well as their appearance in charged particle beams in storage rings and circular accelerators have been summarized in.
