= Ira B. Bernstein =

American theoretical physicist (1924–2024)

Ira Borah Bernstein
- Born: November 8, 1924; New York City, U.S.
- Died: October 8, 2024 (aged 99)
- Education: City College of New York (B.S.); New York University (Ph.D.)
- Known for: Bernstein waves Bernstein–Greene–Kruskal modes
- Awards: James Clerk Maxwell Prize for Plasma Physics (1984)
- Scientific career
- Fields: Plasma physics

Ira Borah Bernstein (November 8, 1924 – October 8, 2024) was an American theoretical physicist specializing in plasma physics. He was the first person to formulate the theory of electrostatic waves propagating in a magnetized plasma in 1958, which are now commonly known as Bernstein waves in plasma physics.

Bernstein's other theoretical contributions include the development of the energy principle in the study of plasma instabilities, as well as formulating the exact (one-dimensional) solution to electrostatic wave propagation in an unmagnetized plasma also known as Bernstein–Greene–Kruskal modes.

== Life and career ==
Bernstein studied chemical engineering at the City College of New York (Baccalaureate 1944) and in 1950 received his PhD from New York University with his thesis entitled "Improved Calculations on Cascade Shower Theory". From 1950 to 1954, he worked at the Westinghouse research laboratories. From 1954 to 1964, he was a scientist at the Princeton Plasma Physics Laboratory, where he was a participant as a senior scientist in Project Matterhorn when the project involved secret U.S. government research on magnetic fusion. In 1964, he became a professor for applied physics at Yale University, where he was from 1994 "Carl A. Morse" Professor for Mechanical Engineering and Applied Physics. In 2004, he retired with the rank of professor emeritus.

He was a research consultant with the research laboratories of United Technologies and RCA, the Los Alamos National Laboratory, and the Naval Research Laboratory. He was a member of the Fusion Policy Advisory Committee and the Consulting Committee for Fusion Energy at the U.S. Department of Energy.

Bernstein died on October 8, 2024, at the age of 99.

== Honors and awards ==
In 1982, Bernstein was awarded the James Clerk Maxwell Prize for Plasma Physics from the American Physical Society. In 1984, he was elected a member of the National Academy of Sciences.
