= Fifth-order Korteweg–De Vries equation =

A fifth-order Korteweg–De Vries (KdV) equation is a nonlinear partial differential equation in 1+1 dimensions related to the Korteweg–De Vries equation. Fifth order KdV equations may be used to model dispersive phenomena such as plasma waves when the third-order contributions are small. The term may refer to equations of the form

$$u_{t}+\alpha u_{xxx}+\beta u_{xxxxx} = \frac {\partial} {\partial x} f(u, u_{x}, u_{xx})$$

where $f$ is a smooth function and $\alpha$ and $\beta$ are real with $\beta \neq 0$. Unlike the KdV system, it is not integrable. It admits a great variety of soliton solutions.
