= Modified Korteweg–De Vries equation =

Nonlinear partial differential equation

The modified Korteweg–de Vries (KdV) equation is an integrable nonlinear partial differential equation:

$$u_t+u_{xxx}+\alpha u^2 u_x=0 \,$$

where $\alpha$ is an arbitrary (nonzero) constant.

This is a special case of the Gardner equation.

== See also ==
- Korteweg–de Vries equation
