= Clyde Kruskal =

American computer scientist

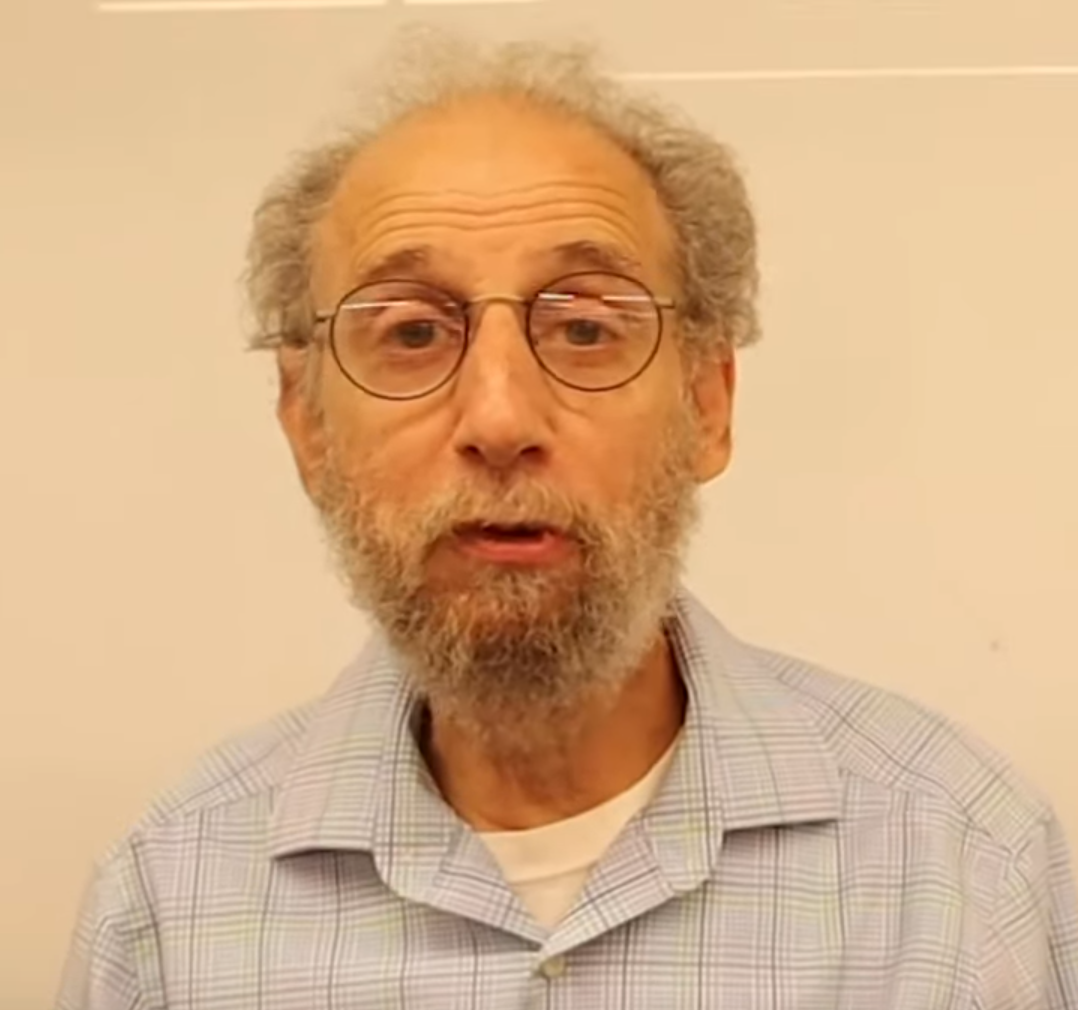
- Kruskal in September 2019
- Born: May 25, 1954 (age 71)
- Occupation: Computer scientist
- Known for: Parallel computing

Clyde P. Kruskal (born May 25, 1954) is an American computer scientist, working on parallel computing architectures, models, and algorithms. As part of the ultracomputer project, he was one of the inventors of the read–modify–write concept in parallel and distributed computing. He is an associate professor of computer science at the University of Maryland, College Park.

== Early life, education, and career ==
Kruskal is the son of mathematician Martin Kruskal. He graduated from Brandeis University in 1976, and went to the Courant Institute of Mathematical Sciences at New York University for graduate study, earning a master's degree in 1978 and completing his Ph.D. in 1981. His dissertation, Upper and Lower Bounds on the Performance of Parallel Algorithms, was supervised by Jack Schwartz.

He became an assistant professor of computer science at the University of Illinois at Urbana–Champaign before moving to Maryland.

== Selected publications ==
With William Gasarch, Kruskal is the author of the book Problems With A Point: Exploring Math And Computer Science (World Scientific, 2019).

He has many highly-cited research publications, including:

- Clyde P. Kruskal, "Searching, Merging, and Sorting in Parallel Computation", IEEE Trans. Comput. 32 942-946 (1983)
- Clyde P. Kruskal and Marc Snir, "The Performance of Multistage Interconnection Networks for Multiprocessors", IEEE Trans. Comput. 32 1091-1098 (1983)
- Clyde P. Kruskal, Larry Rudolph and Marc Snir, "The Power of Parallel Prefix", IEEE Trans. Comput. 34 965-968 (1985)
- Clyde P. Kruskal and Alan Weiss, "Allocating Independent Subtasks on Parallel Processors", IEEE Trans. Software Eng. 11 1001-1016 (1985)
- Clyde P. Kruskal and Marc Snir, "A Unified Theory of Interconnection Network Structure", Theor. Comput. Sci. 48 75-94 (1986)
- Clyde P. Kruskal, Larry Rudolph and Marc Snir, "Efficient Synchronization on Multiprocessors with Shared Memory". ACM Trans. Program. Lang. Syst. 10 579-601 (1988)
- Clyde P. Kruskal, Marc Snir and Alan Weiss, "The Distribution of Waiting Times in Clocked Multistage Interconnection Networks", IEEE Trans. Comput. 37 1337-1352 (1988)
- Clyde P. Kruskal, Larry Rudolph and Marc Snir, "Techniques for Parallel Manipulation of Sparse Matrices", Theor. Comput. Sci. 64 135-157 (1989)
- Clyde P. Kruskal, Larry Rudolph and Marc Snir, "A Complexity Theory of Efficient Parallel Algorithms", Theor. Comput. Sci. 71 95-132 (1990)
- Clyde P. Kruskal and Marc Snir, "Cost-Performance Tradeoffs for Interconnection Networks", Discrete Applied Mathematics 37/38 359-385 (1992)
