= Robert M. Miura =

Robert M. Miura (September 12, 1938 - November 25, 2018) was a Distinguished Professor of Mathematical Sciences and of Biomedical Engineering at New Jersey Institute of Technology (NJIT) in Newark, New Jersey. He was formerly a professor in the Department of Mathematics at the University of British Columbia in Vancouver.

== Education ==
Miura received his BS (1960) and MS (1962) degrees from University of California, Berkeley. He earned his MA (1964) and PhD (1966) from Princeton University. Following his PhD, Miura was a postdoctoral fellow at the Courant Institute at NYU.

== Research ==
Miura's research has spanned many subjects in the mathematical sciences. His earliest contributions were on the topic of conservation laws for nonlinear wave equations. Miura discovered an inverse scattering transformation known as the Miura Transformation for analytically solving the modified Korteweg–de Vries equation. This work helped establish the theory of solitons.

Miura’s research interests focused on developing mathematical models in neuroscience for cell dynamics. He works with biologists to help them understand how and why a type of depressed brain activity induced in animals spreads as a slow, pathological wave. Robert, along with collaborator Henry Tuckwell, formulated one of the first models of spreading depression using the continuum approach. In recent years, he has expanded on this work in order to understand not just ion, but also energy homeostasis in the brain.

== Life ==
Miura spent 26 years at the University of British Columbia in Vancouver, as a professor of mathematics. He joined NJIT in 2001. He was married to Kathryn Bannai and was a father of four children.

== Honors ==
- Fellow of Royal Society of Canada (1995).
- Fellow of American Association for the Advancement of Science (2005).
- Steele Prize for Seminal Contribution to Research, American Mathematical Society (2006)
- Fellow of Society for Industrial and Applied Mathematics (2009).
- Fellow of American Mathematical Society (2012).
