= Shrira–Pesenson equation =

Mathematical model of wave dynamics

Oblique interaction of solitary waves. The stem shows a sharp change in amplitude and phase angle—a shock wave—propagating along a soliton front. Photographed near the Scripps Institution of Oceanography pier.

The Shrira–Pesenson (SP) equation is a partial differential equation describing nonlinear wave motion on the front of a ridge-like solitary wave, called a soliton. The SP equation describes how such a soliton, even if only slightly bent, can develop a shock wave propagating along its front.

The equation applies universally to broad classes of nonlinear evolution equations that admit soliton solutions; its coefficients differ for different soliton families, but the structure of the equation is the same. It arises in a wide range of physical contexts, including fluid dynamics, plasma physics, solid-state physics, and nonlinear optics, wherever a nominally one-dimensional solitary wave propagates in a medium that is weakly non-one-dimensional.

== Overview ==
A wavefront is by definition a surface of constant phase, so a solitary one-dimensional (plane) wavefront represents a single, moving geometric boundary (ridge), where the wave's phase angle remains uniform across space. For single-parameter solitons, phase and amplitude are not independent, so this uniformity extends to the amplitude as well. In simple terms, the SP equation describes how such a soliton, even if only slightly bent—which makes its phase and amplitude no longer uniform—can develop a sharp change in amplitude and phase angle—a shock wave—propagating along its front.

The Shrira–Pesenson equation describes the mechanism by which a slightly bent soliton front evolves into a shock wave—shock-on-soliton propagating along the front. When the soliton is stable, the SP equation reduces to the Burgers' equation, describing the formation and internal structure of soliton-shock—analogous to Whitham's concept of "shock-shock"—and extends the Mach-type irregular interaction of shock waves to the oblique interaction of solitons, thus describing the triple-point structure observed in soliton reflection. When the soliton is unstable, the equation describes soliton self-focusing and provides the instability threshold and growth rate.

Formally, the equation governs the evolution of transverse perturbations of finite length and amplitude on the front of a planar soliton, and takes the following form:

$$\alpha_{tt} - c_0^2 \Delta_\perp \alpha + [\lambda_1(\alpha_t)^2 + \gamma_1(\alpha_y)^2 + \gamma_1(\alpha_z)^2]_t - \mu \Delta_\perp \alpha_t = 0 \qquad (1)$$

where:

- $\alpha(y,z,t)$ is the transverse perturbation of the one-dimensional soliton
- $\Delta_\perp = \partial^2_{yy} + \partial^2_{zz}$ is the transverse Laplace operator
- $c_0$ is the linear transverse wave speed
- $\lambda_1$ and $\gamma_1$ are nonlinearity coefficients
- $\mu$ is an effective viscosity

The coefficients $c_0$, $\lambda_1$, $\gamma_1$, $\mu$ are all determined by explicit integral formulas over the soliton profile.

== History ==
=== Background ===
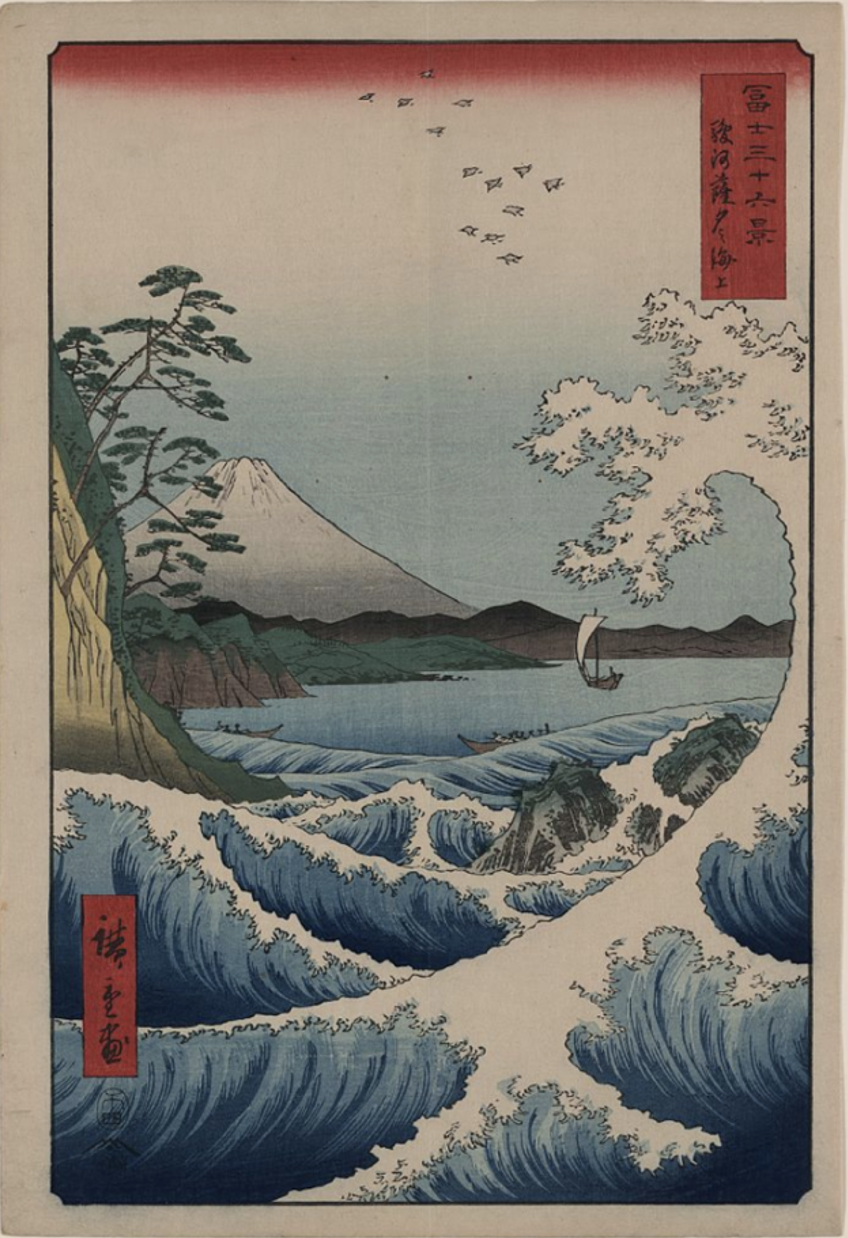
An artistic representation of wave fronts meeting at an angle, in The Sea at Satta in Suruga Province (1858) from Thirty-six Views of Mount Fuji by Utagawa Hiroshige

The Korteweg–de Vries (KdV) equation describes many types of one-dimensional nonlinear waves in dispersive media, such as shallow-water waves, magnetosonic and ion acoustic waves in plasma, waves in condenced media. It is notable as the prototypical example of an integrable partial differential equation that has various explicit solutions, and particularly soliton solutions. The stability and dynamics of such soliton solutions are well studied in one-dimensional cases.

However, in real-world applications, transverse perturbations of the phase and amplitude of the one-dimensional soliton are present, and the problem of transverse stability and self-focusing is of great practical importance. To study this problem, that is, the stability and dynamics of one-dimensional solitons with respect to transverse perturbations, Boris Kadomtsev and Vladimir Petviashvili generalized the KdV equation to weakly non-one-dimensional waves by deriving what is now known as the Kadomtsev–Petviashvili (KP) equation, and establishing within its framework the transverse instability of planar KdV solitons for media with positive dispersion.

Subsequently, in 1975, Vladimir E. Zakharov derived the dispersion relation for infinitesimal transverse perturbations of the KdV soliton using the inverse scattering transform; this work is reviewed by Yuri Kivshar and D. E. Pelinovsky.

While studying tsunamis, Robert L. Wiegel found that in certain coastal regions they had exhibited characteristics that diffraction calculations, refraction diagrams and run-up theory did not account for. In 1956, John D. Isaacs suggested to him that this might be due to something analogous to Mach reflection in nonlinear acoustics. To test this, Wiegel and his students at UC Berkeley conducted a series of experiments relevant to coastal engineering. Their first experiments studied oblique reflection of solitary waves and confirmed that the Mach-reflection phenomenon did exist. Wiegel reported in 1964 that regular reflection of a solitary wave at a rigid wall is impossible for sufficiently small angles of incidence and is replaced by Mach reflection, which is geometrically similar to the reflection of shock waves. In this reflection, a third solitary wave, the Mach stem, joins the apex of the incident and reflected waves to the wall. Wiegel also presented the importance of this phenomenon to the study of tsunami action at Hilo, Hawaii, where a Mach stem was observed along the cliffs of Hilo Bay when the 1946 Aleutian tsunami struck.

In 1977, Alan C. Newell and L. G. Redekopp recognized that collisions of solitons in more than one dimension can lead to the formation of new solitons, a phenomenon called resonant interaction, in the context of the KP and nonlinear Schrödinger equations. John W. Miles observed that the oblique interaction of two line solitons becomes resonant at a critical angle and gave an early answer to the question of its practical consequences, a substantial increase in wave amplitude during the resonant Mach reflection. He showed that the observed Mach reflection of a solitary wave at a wall, which is geometrically similar to the reflection of shock waves, can be described as a resonant interaction among three obliquely oriented solitary waves.

From 1976, L. A. Ostrovsky and V. I. Shrira also studied the two-dimensional dynamics of solitary waves by generalizing Whitham's geometrical optics approach for refraction of shock waves to solitons; their work is reviewed by Kivshar and Pelinovsky. This approach assumed adiabatic evolution and did not account for the finite wavelength of the transverse perturbations, reducing the problem of two-dimensional soliton dynamics to a nonlinear hyperbolic system of equations. The solution of this system develops an infinite derivative, which limits its applicability by preventing a description of the evolution of perturbations beyond such a singularity.

=== Shrira and Pesenson ===
The linear form of the equation for transverse perturbations of finite length was derived by Pesenson in 1983. The nonlinear generalization was presented jointly by Shrira and Pesenson at the Second International Workshop on Nonlinear and Turbulent Processes in Physics (1983). The equation was named the "Shrira–Pesenson equation" in the review article by Kivshar and Pelinovsky in Physics Reports (2000).

Whereas the geometrical optics approaches develop a singularity after which the evolution of the perturbation can no longer be described, the Shrira–Pesenson equation captures simultaneously both the finite amplitude and the finite ratio of the soliton width to the transverse perturbation wavelength, thus extending the frameworks of previous approaches and allowing the evolution to be followed past the singularity.

== Physical significance ==
The Shrira–Pesenson equation is applicable across a broad spectrum of physical systems—surface and internal waves in fluid dynamics and plasma physics, nonlinear waves in solid-state and condensed-matter physics, and spatial optical solitons in nonlinear optics and photonics—in all cases describing the universal behavior of transverse perturbations of finite amplitude and length on the front of planar solitons. The comprehensive review by Kivshar and Pelinovsky surveyed self-focusing and transverse instabilities of solitary waves across related models, and included a detailed analysis of the Shrira–Pesenson equation in Section 5.3.2 of the review.

Two broad classes of nonlinear evolution equations were considered in Pesenson (1983)—a dispersive KP-type class and a hyperbolic Klein–Gordon type class:

$$\begin{align}
u_{xt} + \partial^2_{xx} \hat{M}[u] &= \Delta_\perp u \qquad \text{(dispersive / KP type)} \qquad &(2)\\
u_{tt} + \partial^2_{xx} \hat{M}[u] &= \Delta_\perp u \qquad \text{(hyperbolic / Klein-Gordon type)} \qquad &(3)
\end{align}$$

where $\hat{M}[u]$ is a nonlinear integro-differential operator chosen so that the equation admits stable traveling solitary wave solutions $u(\theta)$, where $\theta = x - vt$, and $\textstyle\Delta_\perp = \partial^2_{YY} + \partial^2_{ZZ}$ is the transverse Laplace operator. These classes include, in particular, non-one-dimensional versions of the KdV (KP equation), Modified KdV equation (MKdV), Burgers, Boussinesq, Benjamin–Ono, and Klein–Gordon equations.

Oblique interaction of shallow-water waves near the Scripps Institution of Oceanography pier

Mach-type interaction in a grid of obliquely interacting shallow-water waves. Planar soliton fronts bend and interact in this way when subject to transverse perturbations, the subject of the Shrira–Pesenson equation.

Through a multiple-scale asymptotic expansion in the small parameter $\varepsilon = l_x/l_y \ll 1$—the ratio of the soliton width to the transverse perturbation wavelength—it was shown that the dynamics of small perturbations on the front of planar solitons belonging to classes (2) and (3) satisfy the linearized Burgers' equation. The dispersion relation of this equation describes decaying oscillations when 1-D solitons are transversely stable, and furnishes the instability threshold wavenumber and growth rate when they are not. Explicit dispersion relations were computed in Pesenson (1983) for the KP equation, the modified KP equation, the Klein–Gordon type equations, as well as, in nonlinear acoustics, for the Zabolotskaya–Khokhlov equation with dissipation, now known as the Khokhlov–Zabolotskaya–Kuznetsov (KZK) equation.

Extension of the asymptotic procedure to third order in Shrira and Pesenson (1984) yielded the nonlinear equation governing perturbations of finite length and amplitude—equation (1) above. The paper also showed that the equation is universal: its structure is the same for all single-parameter soliton families belonging to classes (2) and (3), with coefficients that differ by soliton family. The complete derivation of equation (1) is given in Pesenson (1991), where quasioptics, which is closely related to physical optics, is extended to nonlinear waves, whereas interference and diffraction of linear waves are the subject of traditional physical optics. This extension goes beyond the geometrical optics approaches of Whitham and of Ostrovsky and Shrira by enabling the description—past the point where those approaches break down—of interference and refraction of nonlinear waves, in particular solitons, and allowing one to find explicit shock-wave solutions.

When the soliton is stable (negative dispersion), the SP equation reduces, in the one-way wave approximation, to the nonlinear Burgers' equation for the perturbation amplitude $\psi = \alpha_{T_1}$:

$$\psi_{T_1} \pm c_0 \psi_{Y_1} + \beta \psi\psi_{Y_1} - \mu \psi_{Y_1Y_1} = 0$$

where, as before, the coefficients $c_0$, $\beta$, and $\mu$ are determined by explicit integral formulas over the soliton profile. This Burgers' equation describes the formation of a shock wave on the soliton front—soliton-shock analogous to Whitham's "shock-shock"—and shows that the internal structure of such soliton-shock is determined by high-frequency dissipation due to diffraction and energy radiation into the tail (a small-amplitude wave packet) of the soliton. The shock wave corresponds to a triple point in the Mach-type reflection of oblique solitons. When the soliton is unstable, the SP equation describes soliton self-focusing and provides the instability threshold and growth rate.

== See also ==
- Korteweg–de Vries equation
- Kadomtsev–Petviashvili equation
- Benjamin–Ono equation
- Sine–Gordon equation
- Burgers' equation
- Nonlinear Schrödinger equation
- Modified KdV equation
- Davey–Stewartson equation
- List of nonlinear partial differential equations
- Nonlinear partial differential equation
- Quasioptics
- Physical optics
- Nonlinear acoustics
- Waves in plasma
