= Petviashvili =

Petviashvili (Georgian: ფეტვიაშვილი) is a Georgian surname that may refer to the following notable people:

- Rusudan Petviashvili (born 1968), Georgian artist
- Vladimir Petviashvili (1936–1993), Soviet physicist from Georgia
  - Kadomtsev–Petviashvili equation
