= Kadomtsev–Petviashvili equation =

PDE to describe nonlinear wave motion

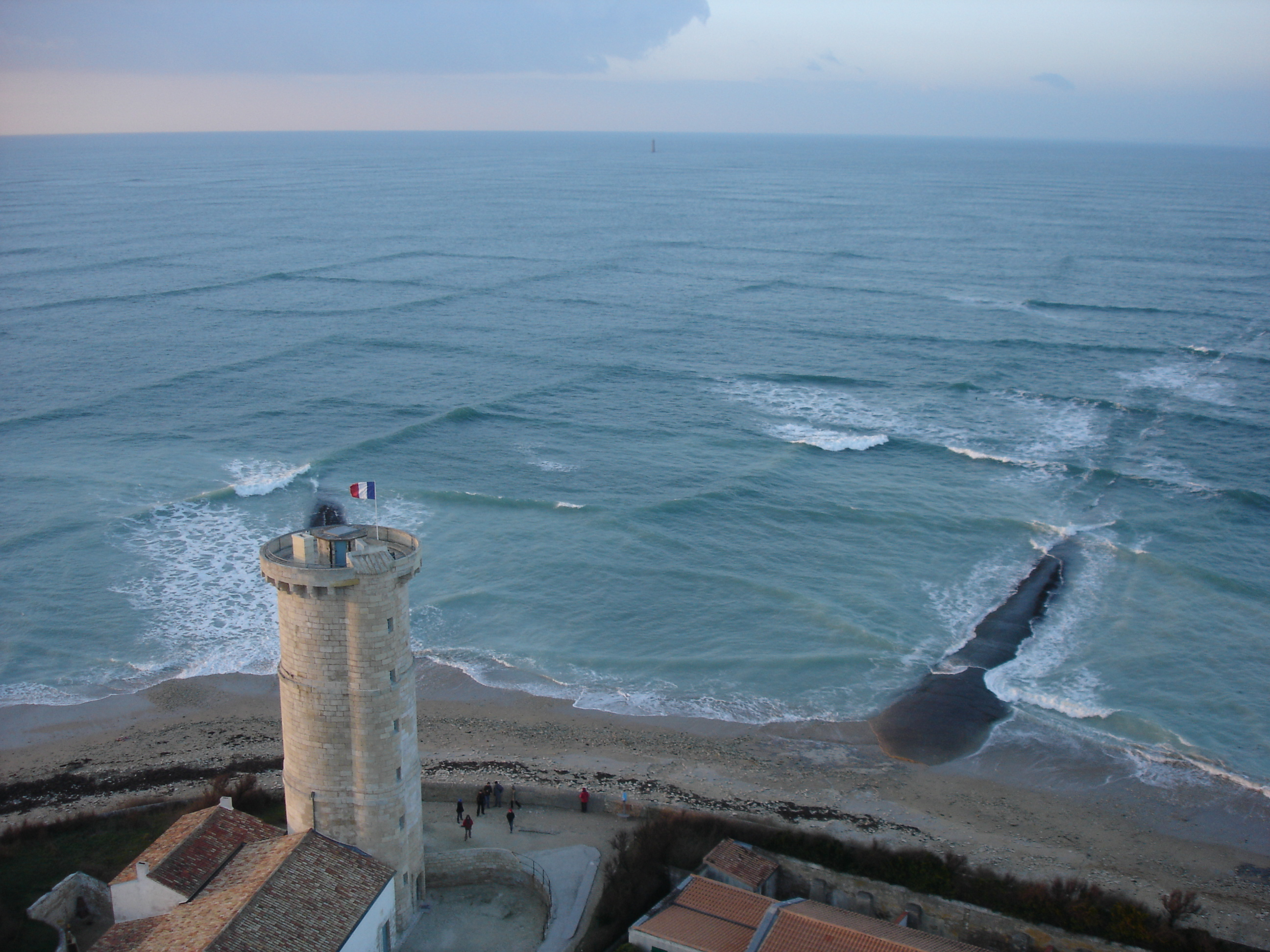
Crossing swells, consisting of near-cnoidal wave trains. Photo taken from Phares des Baleines (Whale Lighthouse) at the western point of Île de Ré (Isle of Rhé), France, in the Atlantic Ocean. The interaction of such near-solitons in shallow water may be modeled through the Kadomtsev–Petviashvili equation.

In mathematics and physics, the Kadomtsev–Petviashvili equation (often abbreviated as KP equation) is a partial differential equation to describe nonlinear wave motion. Named after Boris Borisovich Kadomtsev and Vladimir Iosifovich Petviashvili, the KP equation is usually written as
$$\displaystyle \partial_x(\partial_t u+u \partial_x u+\epsilon^2\partial_{xxx}u)+\lambda\partial_{yy}u=0$$
where $\lambda=\pm 1$. The above form shows that the KP equation is a generalization to two spatial dimensions, x and y, of the one-dimensional Korteweg–de Vries (KdV) equation. To be physically meaningful, the wave propagation direction has to be not-too-far from the x direction, i.e. with only slow variations of solutions in the y direction. Kadomtsev and Petviashvili studied the stability of a KdV soliton in the presence of small, infinitely long transverse perturbations. Later Zakharov derived the dispersion relation for infinitesimal transverse perturbations of the KdV soliton using the inverse scattering transform. The transverse stability and dynamics of a single planar soliton with respect to perturbations of finite-amplitude and wavelength are described by the Shrira-Pesenson equation.

Like the KdV equation, the KP equation is completely integrable. It can also be solved using the inverse scattering transform much like the nonlinear Schrödinger equation.

The Lax pair representation for the KP equation, which underlies its integrability by the inverse scattering transform, was first obtained by Valery Dryuma in 1974, shortly before the inverse scattering method for two-dimensional equations was developed by Zakharov and Shabat the same year.

In 2002, the regularized version of the KP equation, naturally referred to as the Benjamin–Bona–Mahony–Kadomtsev–Petviashvili equation (or simply the BBM-KP equation), was introduced as an alternative model for small amplitude long waves in shallow water moving mainly in the x direction in 2+1 space.

$$\displaystyle \partial_x(\partial_t u+u \partial_x u+\epsilon^2\partial_{xxt}u)+\lambda\partial_{yy}u=0$$

where $\lambda=\pm 1$. The BBM-KP equation provides an alternative to the usual KP equation, in a similar way that the Benjamin–Bona–Mahony equation is related to the classical Korteweg–de Vries equation, as the linearized dispersion relation of the BBM-KP is a good approximation to that of the KP but does not exhibit the unwanted limiting behavior as the Fourier variable dual to x approaches $\pm \infty$. The BBM-KP equation can be viewed as a weak transverse perturbation of the Benjamin–Bona–Mahony equation. As a result, the solutions of their corresponding Cauchy problems share an intriguing and complex mathematical relationship. Aguilar et al. proved that the solution of the Cauchy problem for the BBM-KP model equation converges to the solution of the Cauchy problem associated to the Benjamin–Bona–Mahony equation in the $L^2$ -based Sobolev space $H^{k}_{x}(\R)$ for all $k \ge 1$, provided their corresponding initial data are close in $H^{k}_{x}(\R)$ as the transverse variable $y \rightarrow \pm \infty$.

== History ==
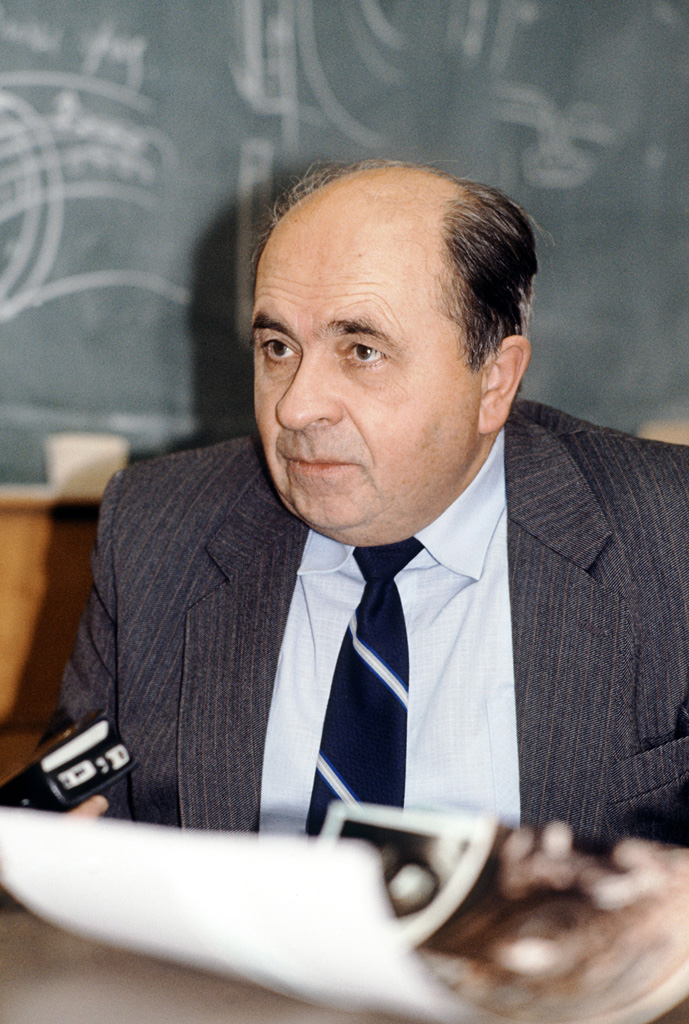
Boris Kadomtsev.

The KP equation was first written in 1970 by Soviet physicists Boris B. Kadomtsev (1928–1998) and Vladimir I. Petviashvili (1936–1993); it came as a natural generalization of the KdV equation (derived by Korteweg and De Vries in 1895). Whereas in the KdV equation waves are strictly one-dimensional, in the KP equation this restriction is relaxed. Still, both in the KdV and the KP equation, waves have to travel in the positive x-direction.

== Connections to physics ==
The KP equation can be used to model water waves of long wavelength with weakly non-linear restoring forces and frequency dispersion. If surface tension is weak compared to gravitational forces, $\lambda=+1$ is used; if surface tension is strong, then $\lambda=-1$. Because of the asymmetry in the way x- and y-terms enter the equation, the waves described by the KP equation behave differently in the direction of propagation (x-direction) and transverse (y) direction; oscillations in the y-direction tend to be smoother (be of small-deviation).

The KP equation can also be used to model waves in ferromagnetic media, as well as two-dimensional matter–wave pulses in Bose–Einstein condensates.

== Limiting behavior ==
For $\epsilon\ll 1$, typical x-dependent oscillations have a wavelength of $O(1/\epsilon)$ giving a singular limiting regime as $\epsilon\rightarrow 0$. The limit $\epsilon\rightarrow 0$ is called the dispersionless limit.

If we also assume that the solutions are independent of y as $\epsilon\rightarrow 0$, then they also satisfy the inviscid Burgers' equation:

$$\displaystyle \partial_t u+u\partial_x u=0.$$

Suppose the amplitude of oscillations of a solution is asymptotically small — $O(\epsilon)$ — in the dispersionless limit. Then the amplitude satisfies a mean-field equation of Davey–Stewartson type.

== See also ==
- Novikov–Veselov equation
- Schottky problem
- Dispersionless KP equation
