= Howell Peregrine =

British mathematician

D. Howell Peregrine
- Born: 30 December 1938
- Died: 20 March 2007 (aged 68); Bristol
- Education: Oxford University; Cambridge University
- Scientific career
- Fields: Fluid mechanics Coastal engineering
- Workplaces: University of Bristol
- Doctoral advisor: T. Brooke Benjamin FRS

Howell Peregrine (30 December 1938 – 20 March 2007) was a British applied mathematician noted for his contributions to fluid mechanics, especially of free surface flows such as water waves, and coastal engineering.

== Education and career ==
Howell Peregrine joined the Mathematics Department of University of Bristol in 1964 following his undergraduate and postgraduate training at Oxford and Cambridge. He spent his entire career at Bristol. One of his most remarkable contributions was the theoretical prediction of a new nonlinear entity, now called the Peregrine soliton, that may explain the formation of hydrodynamics rogue waves and that has also been experimentally demonstrated more than 25 years later in the field of nonlinear fiber optics and then in 2011 in hydrodynamics with experiments in a water wave tank.

He was an associate editor of the Journal of Fluid Mechanics for more than 25 years.

Howell Peregrine died suddenly after a short battle against cancer. He was at the time a professor emeritus of applied mathematics at the University of Bristol.

== Personal ==
Peregrine was known to be a good photographer of natural phenomena. Some of the photographs which he took himself appeared in his papers.

== See also ==
- Regularized long-wave equation
- Wave–current interaction
