= Monge equation =

In the mathematical theory of partial differential equations, a Monge equation, named after Gaspard Monge, is a type of first-order partial differential equation.

A Monge equation is a function of type $F(u, q^{1:n}, p_{1:n}): \R^{2n+1} \to \R$. The problem is to find solutions of type $u(q^{1:n}): \R^n \to \R$, such that
$$F\left(u,q, \partial_q u\right)=0.$$
In modern notation, it is an equation on a differentiable manifold $M$ defined by a function $F: \R \times T^*M \to \R$, where $T^*M$ is the cotangent bundle. The problem is to find solutions of type $u(q): M \to \R$, such that
$$F\left(u,q, du\right)=0.$$
The Hamilton–Jacobi equation is a particularly important example.

== Solution ==
The Monge equation is usually solved by the method of characteristics. Specifically by the Monge cone.

=== Quasilinear case ===
Monge first studied the case where F is linear in the derivatives:
$$A^0(u, q) + \sum_{i=0}^n A^i(u, q) \partial_{q^i} u = 0$$
where $A^{0:n}$ are functions of $u, q$. This case is called a quasilinear first-order PDE. When $A^1, \dots, A^n$ do not depend on $u$, it is a semilinear first-order PDE.

Consider the graph of a solution surface in $\R \times M$. The tangent to the graph at a fixed point $u, q$ has equations
$$a_0 du + a_i dq^i = 0$$
where the real-valued coefficients satisfy $A^\mu a_\mu = 0$. This is a linear equation, and set of all solutions $\{a_\mu : a_\mu A^\mu = 0\}$ make up a codimension-1 subspace in the cotangent space $T^*_{(u, q)}(\R \times M)$.

Dually, the annihilator to $\{a_\mu : a_\mu A^\mu = 0\}$ is a dimension-1 subspace in the tangent space $T_{(u, q)}(\R \times M)$, called the Monge axis. It is spanned by the characteristic vector $A^0 \partial_u + A^i \partial_{q^i}$. Any solution graph that passes the point $u, q$ must necessarily contain the characteristic vector.

Thus, we obtain the characteristic vector field of the equation in $\R \times M$. Integrating the field, we obtain a fibration of $\R \times M$ into a $\R^n$-parameterized family of 1-dimensional curves. These are the characteristic curves of the equation. Since solving these characteristic curves requires only integrating an ODE, this is said to have "reduced to quadratures" or "is integrable".

Any solution graph must be fibrated into the characteristic curves. Conversely, any $\R^{n-1}$-parameterized subfamily of characteristic curves make up a solution graph, and can be obtained by taking any smooth codimension-2 surface $S \subset \R\times M$, and taking the union of all characteristic curves passing this surface. This surface represents the Cauchy boundary condition for the equation. This has a few exceptions:

- Caustic: If the assumptions of Picard–Lindelöf theorem are not satisfied, then different characteristic curves may converge to or diverge from the same point, i.e. the curves are singular solutions. A solution graph that contains a singular solution curve becomes indeterminate beyond the singular point. Multiple characteristics might collapse to one (shock wave), and one characteristic might diverge to many (rarefaction).
- If the surface $S$ that encodes the Cauchy boundary condition is not transverse to the characteristic vector field, then the surface swept out by $S$ would contain duplicate solution curves, and thus lose at least one dimension. The condition that Cauchy boundary is transverse to the characteristic vector field is the noncharacteristic rank condition.
- If $(A^1, \dots, A^n) = 0$ at some point on the characteristic curve, then the curve would move directly vertically, which means a surface containing such a curve, even if smooth and well-defined, will no longer be the graph of a differentiable function of type $M \to \R$. This is a finite-time singularity. This corresponds to the original differential equation degenerating into $A^0(u, q) = 0$.

=== Characteristic strip ===
Propagation of bicharacteristics on a characteristic strip. The black lines are infinitesimally separated characteristic curves of the function. The red lines are the infinitesimally separated contour curves of the function. The red gradients represent the covectors being propagated along a characteristic curve. The bicharacteristic is the combined propagation of both the covector and the characteristic curve.

A characteristic strip is an infinitesimal thickening of a characteristic curve, constructed as the slice of solution surface obtained from an infinitesimal codimension-2 initial condition surface $\delta S \subset T_{(u, q)}(\R\times M)$ that is transverse to the characteristic vector field at that point. Equivalently, it can be understood as the trajectory in the space of infinitesimal wavefronts (wavelets) $\R \times T^* M$. In this perspective, the equation set
$$A^0(u, q) + A^i(u, q) p_i = 0, \quad du - p_i dq^i = 0$$
is a wave equation. A solution surface $u$ is decomposed to a (n-1)-dimensional family of infinitesimal wavefronts that independently propagate according to the wave equation.

=== General case ===
When the case is not quasilinear, the problem is still finding characteristic strips of
$$F(u, q, p) = 0, \quad du - p_i dq^i = 0$$
Define the 1-form $\alpha = du - p_i dq^i$. The condition $\alpha = 0$ defines a contact structure on the (2n+1)-dimensional manifold of wavelets $\R \times T^* M$, written as $(\R \times T^* M, \alpha)$, and called the 1-jet manifold, while the condition $F(u, q, p) = 0$ defines a hypersurface. The problem is finding a n-dimensional submanifold that is tangent to the contact structure while staying within the 2n-dimensional submanifold $S := F^{-1}(0)$. In other words, it is finding Legendrian submanifolds in $S$. Any differentiable function $u: M \to \R$ uniquely lifts to a Legendrian submanifold, and conversely, any Legendrian submanifold that is nowhere vertical is the lift of a unique $u: M \to \R$ obtained by taking the projection map $\R \times T^* M \to \R \times M$ (i.e. by forgetting $p$).

This has a standard solution in contact geometry. Begin with the (2n+1)-dimensional contact manifold $(\R \times T^* M, \alpha)$, and define the 2-form $\omega = d\alpha$ and the Reeb vector field $R := \partial_u$. The characteristic strips are the integral curves of the bicharateristic vector field $X_F$ satisfying the contact Hamiltonian equations:
$$\alpha(X_F)=F, \quad \omega(X_F, \cdot )=d F-(R F) \alpha$$
The integral curves of bicharateristic vector field are the bicharacteristic curves, which are trajectories traced out by the characteristic strips. In coordinates,
$$X_F = (X_{F, u}, X_{F, q}, X_{F, p}) = (p \cdot \partial_p F, \partial_p F, - \partial_q F- (\partial_u F) p)$$
Any Legendrian submanifold in $S$ is fibrated into a $\R^{n-1}$-family of bicharacteristic curves. Conversely, given any $\R^{n-1}$-parameterized submanifold in $S$ that is transverse to $X_F$, it extends to a Legendrian submanifold in $S$ by taking the union of all bicharacteristic curves through it.

A Cauchy boundary condition is a $\R^{n-1}$-parameterized submanifold in $\R \times M$:
$$(s^1, \dots, s^{n-1}) \mapsto (u_0(s), q_{0}^1(s), \dots, q_{0}^n(s))$$
The solution is obtained by lifting it to a $\R^{n-1}$-parameterized submanifold in $\R \times M$:
$$(s^1, \dots, s^{n-1}) \mapsto (u_0(s), q_{0}^1(s), \dots, q_{0}^n(s), p_{0, 1}(s), \dots, p_{0, n-1}(s))$$
that satisfies
$$F(u_0(s), q_0(s), p_0(s)) = 0, \quad \partial_{s^k}u_0 - \sum_{i=1}^n p_i \partial_{s^k} q_0^i = 0, \quad k = 1, \dots, n-1$$
The solution exists and is unique, with some exceptions:

- If the boundary condition is not transverse to $X_F$, then it breaks the noncharacteristic rank condition. In this case, the equation fails to determine how the boundary condition should be lifted.
- If at some point $(u, q, p) \in S$, the surface is tangent to $\ker \alpha$, then $X_F(u, q, p) = 0$, indicating that the equation fails to determine how the infinitesimal wavefront propagates beyond this point.

=== Monge cone ===
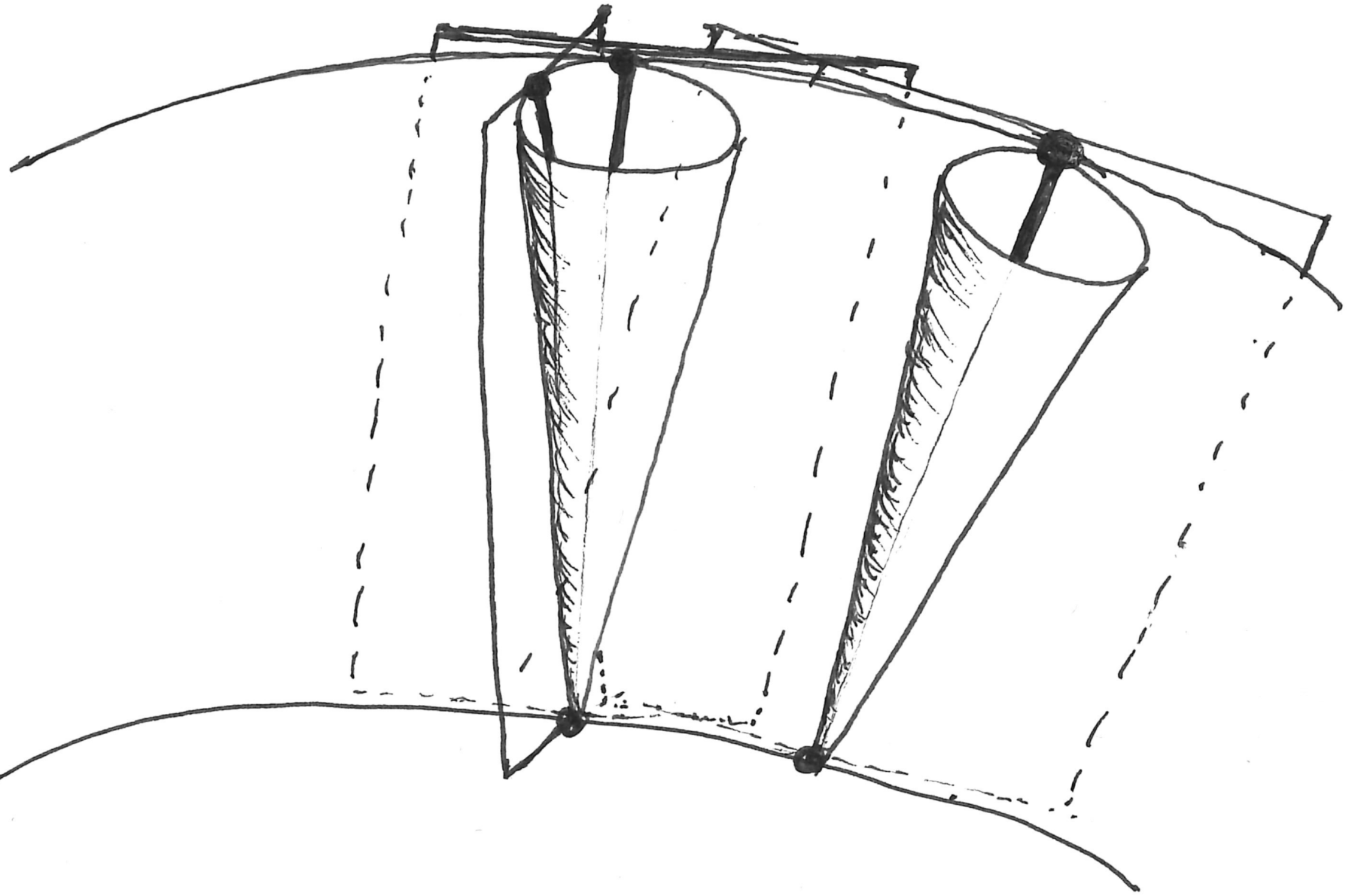
Monge cones along a solution surface. The cone at each point is tangent to the tangent plane passing the point. The tangent line is the bicharacteristic direction. Each cone is swept out by all possible tangent planes that solves $F = 0$ at that point.

Monge solved the equation by a geometric construction called the Monge cone. Consider the totality of all solution surfaces that pass a fixed point $(u, q) \in \R \times M$. Their envelope surface is a cone with apex $(u, q)$. This is the Monge cone at this point. Given a Cauchy boundary condition specified by a $\R^{n-1}$-dimensional submanifold in $\R \times M$, the solution surface is the extension that is tangent to all cones at all locations. In other words, the solution surface is constructed by taking a branch of the envelope of the cones.

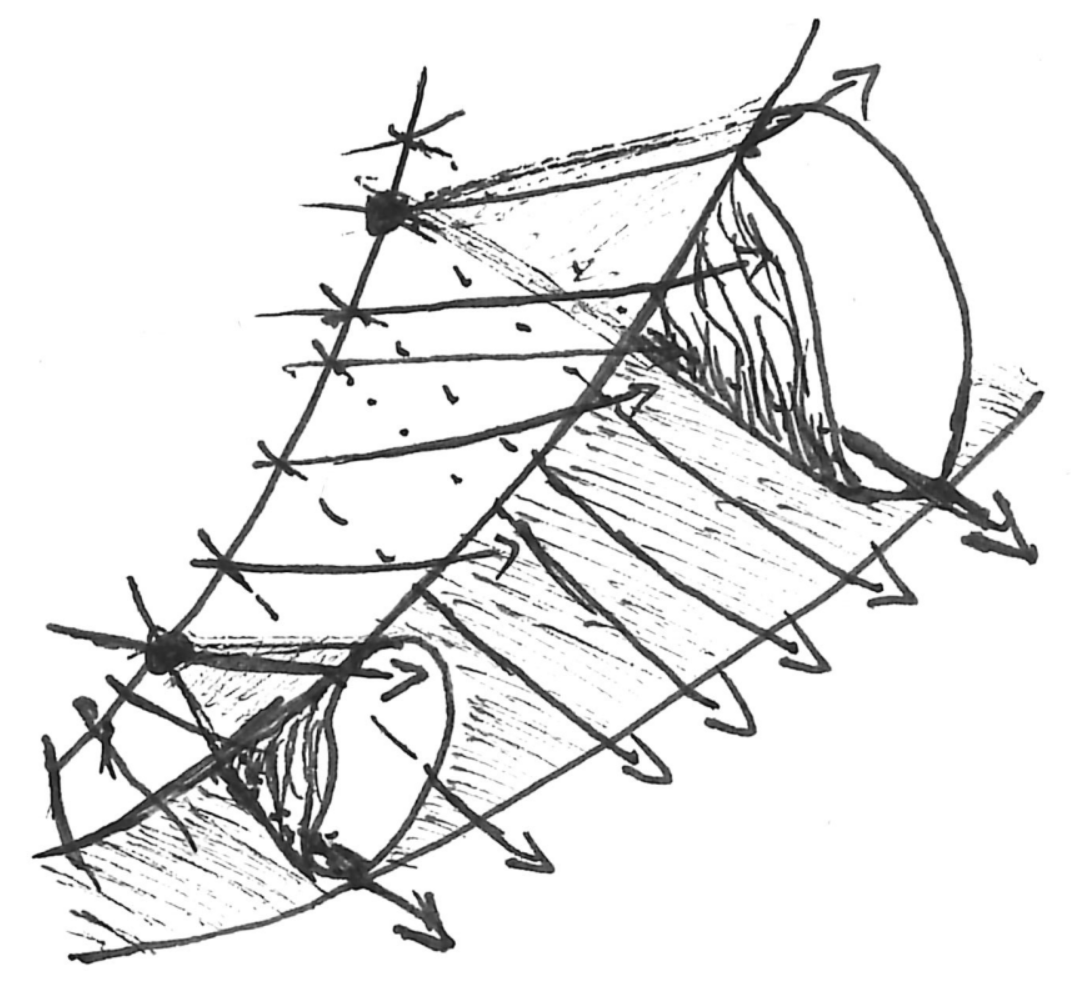
Monge cones along a Cauchy boundary condition sweeps out branches of a solution. The tangent curves are the bicharacteristics.

The intersections between the cones and the solution surface are tangent to the characteristic curves, and lifts to bicharacteristic curves in $\R \times T^* M$. When the noncharacteristic rank condition is satisfied, the envelope of the cones has only finitely many branches, and so there are only finitely many solution surfaces.

In the special case of quasilinear equation, the cone degenerates to a single line, the Monge axis.

In the language of contact geometry, each point $(u, q) \in \R \times M$ lifts to an infinitesimal wavefront $(u, q, p) \in \R \times T^* M$. The condition $F(u, q, p) = 0$ restricts the choice of $p$ to a (n-1)-dimensional subset. For any such $p$, the bicharacteristic curve produces a possible trajectory of the wavefront $s \mapsto (u(s), q(s), p(s))$, which projects to a tangent vector $(du/ds, dq/ds) \in \R \times T_{q}M$. The set of spanned by all such tangent vectors is the Monge cone at this point.

== Transformation theory ==
Sophus Lie studied the Monge equation in the framework of Lie group theory and contact geometry.

A contact transformation is a transformation of the 1-jet space $\R \times T^* M$ that preserves the contact structure. For example, any diffeomorphism of the underlying $\R \times M$ lifts to a contact transformation by prolongation. Such contact transformations are called the point transformations. The Legendre transformation is a contact transformation that is not a point transformation.

Given a contact transformation $g$ on $\R \times T^* M$, it transforms a Monge equation $F(u, q, p) = 0$ to $F(g\cdot (u, q, p)) = 0$. Contact transformations map surface elements to surface elements (i.e. infinitesimal hyperplanes in $\R \times M$), solution surfaces to solution surfaces, Monge cones to Monge cones, and bicharacteristics to bicharacteristics.

The symmetry group of a Monge equation is the group of contact transformations such that $F(u, q, p) = 0$ and $F(g\cdot (u, q, p)) = 0$ are the same surface.

Lie proved that in the case of $M = \R^2$:

- If the symmetry group of the equation contains an abelian Lie group with 3 dimensions, then it can be transformed to an equation of the form $F(\partial_{q^1}u, \partial_{q^2} u) = 0$.
- If the symmetry group of the equation contains an abelian Lie group with 2 dimensions, then it can be transformed to an equation of the form $F(u, \partial_{q^1}u, \partial_{q^2} u) = 0$.
- If the symmetry group of the equation is contains an abelian Lie group with 1 dimension, then it can be transformed to an equation of the form $F(q^1, q^2, \partial_{q^1}u, \partial_{q^2} u) = 0$.

To see how such results are obtained, consider the case of 3-dimensional abelian Lie group.

Let the group be generated by the 3 vector fields $X_0, X_1, X_2$. Since the group is abelian, the vector fields have vanishing Lie brackets $[X_i, X_j] = 0$, so they are integrable. That is, there exists a coordinate system $(Q^1, Q^2, U, P_1, P_2)$ in which $X_0 = \partial_{U}, X_1 = \partial_{Q^1}, X_2 = \partial_{Q^2}$. By Darboux's theorem, the other two variables $P_1, P_2$ can be chosen so that the contact form is $\theta = dU - P_i dQ^i$. Therefore, the transformation is a contact transformation.

Since $F = 0$ is invariant under $X_0, X_1, X_2$, in the new coordinates it must be of form $F(P_1, P_2) = 0$.

In the general case, if the symmetry group contains an abelian Lie group with $n$ dimensions, then it can be transformed to an equation of the form $F(\partial_{q^1}u, \dots, \partial_{q^n} u) = 0$. When $F = 0$ is the Hamilton–Jacobi equation, this corresponds to the action-angle coordinates of a fully integrable system. The system viewed as the motion of a particle simply moves at constant momentum forever, since the bicharacteristics are straight lines. The system viewed as the motion of a wave has planar wave solutions that never disperse, since flat planes are solution surfaces.

Nonabelian Lie groups are also possible.

=== Symmetry reduction ===
When a system's dynamics is unchanged by the action of a group, that symmetry can be removed by taking a quotient of the group action. This is symmetry reduction.

If the symmetry group of the equation contains an abelian Lie group with 3 dimensions, it can be transformed to the form of $F(\partial_{q^1}u, \partial_{q^2} u) = 0$. In this case, the Monge cones are the same across the $(u, q^1, q^2)$ space. Therefore, the motion of a particle along a characteristic curve is the same everywhere, and can simply be reduced. In the reduced dynamic, the particle remains in the same place, and the only nontrivial dynamics is its momentum $(\partial_{q^1}u, \partial_{q^2} u)$, which remains constant over time. The dynamics reduces to a standing-still on a circle.

If the symmetry group of the equation contains an abelian Lie group with 2 dimensions, then it can be transformed to an equation of the form $F(u, \partial_{q^1}u, \partial_{q^2} u) = 0$. In this case, the Monge cones are the same across the $(q^1, q^2)$ plane, and varies over $u$. Therefore, the only nontrivial dynamic of a particle along a characteristic curve is the interaction between its height $u$ and the momentum $(\partial_{q^1}u, \partial_{q^2} u)$. The dynamics reduces to a flow on a cylinder.

== Examples ==
=== Low-dimensional cases ===
When $n = 1$, the equation
$$F(u, q^1, \partial_{q^1} u) = 0$$
reduces to an ODE for a function of type $u: \R \to \R$, and at each point $(u, q^1)$, the Monge cone consists of straight lines passing the point with slopes $k$ satisfying $F(u, q^1, k) = 0$. A solution curve remains tangent to each Monge cone.

When $n = 2$, at each point $(u, q^1, q^2)$, the equation
$$F(u, q^1, q^2, \partial_{q^1} u, \partial_{q^2} u) = 0$$
produces a 1-dimensional manifold of possible choices of $(\partial_{q^1} u, \partial_{q^2}u)$. In general, the manifold looks like a union of several closed differentiable curves. Each differentiable curve produces a family of planes, which produces a cone as its envelope. The union of all these cones is the Monge cone.

=== Eikonal equation ===
The simplest fully nonlinear equation is the eikonal equation. This has the form

$$|\nabla u|^2 = 1,$$

so that the function F is given by

$$F(x,y,u,u_x,u_y) = u_x^2+u_y^2-1.$$

The dual cone consists of 1-forms $a dx + b dy + c dz$ satisfying

$$a^2+b^2-c^2=0.$$

This defines a circular cone. The convex dual of a circle is a circle, and so the Monge cone at each point is a circular cone.

This generalizes to the eikonal equation for geodesics in a Riemannian manifold, and more generally a Finsler manifold.

== See also ==
- Tangent cone
- Microlocal analysis
- Contact geometry
