= Rusudan Petviashvili =

Georgian artist (born 1968)

- რუსუდან ფეტვიაშვილი
- Born: 25 January 1968 (age 58); Tbilisi, Georgia
- Education: Tbilisi State Academy of Arts
- Known for: Painting
- Spouse: Teimuraz Badriashvili (m. 1990)
- Website: petviashvili.net

Rusudan Petviashvili (Georgian: რუსუდან ფეტვიაშვილი; (born 25 January 1968), Tbilisi, Georgia) is a Georgian graphic artist. She creates paintings using a unique technique: the total image is performed in one-touch. Petviashvili's works and lives in Tbilisi, but there are few months a year where she works in Berlin, Geneva and Paris where she has a studio.

== Childhood and family ==
Rusudan Petviashvili was born in Tbilisi, 25 January 1968, in family of artists. Her father was a sculptor artist, her mother was a poet and dramaturgist.

She was a talented artist even in early childhood. Petviashvili began painting when she was one and a half years old. Petviashvili's parents tried to keep the identity of her talent, did not put it down, did not try to fit the personality of the girl in any frames. As a child, Rusudan could take charcoal or pencil and begin to draw directly on the walls of the apartment.

Rusudan's ancestors on the paternal side were physicists. The grandmother of the artist led the department of the Institute of Geophysics of the Academy of Sciences of the Georgian SSR, she is one of the founders of the Georgian National Astrophysical Observatory. Uncle of the artist Vladimir Petviashvili is a famous physicist, co-author of the Kadomtsev–Petviashvili equation, winner of the Kurchatov award.

On the maternal side, seventeen generations of Rusudan Petviashvili’s family were spiritual leaders (priests).

Rusudan is the eldest of five children in the family. Her two sisters and two brothers also connect their lives with art: Mariam is an artist working with wool; Salome graduated from the Tbilisi State Academy of Arts as fashion designer; George has been organizing Rusudan's exhibitions; Demetrius, like his father, is the sculptor artist.

In 1990, Rusudan married Teimuraz Badriashvili, the head of the Tbilisi State Puppet Theatre.

== Early solo exhibitions ==
Her first solo exhibition was held in Tbilisi, when the artist was six years old. The show presented around 100 artworks created in a unique technique: drawing performed without detaching from the sheet, in one-touch. In 1977 and 1981, two solo exhibitions of the artist took a place in Moscow. At the age of 14, Rusudan had presented her artworks in various cities of France, including Paris.

== Meeting with Margaret Thatcher ==
In March 1987, Margaret Thatcher had an official visit to the USSR for the first time within 12 years. The head of the British government expressed a desire to see other cities of the Union apart from Moscow, having chosen Tbilisi. In Georgia, the politician visited the National Museum of Art, held negotiations with the government, took a walk through the old town and met Rusudan Petviashvili, who presented to Thatcher one of her artworks.

== The period of study at the Tbilisi State Academy of Art ==
Rusudan Petviashvili graduated from the Tbilisi State Academy of Arts, where she was accepted without examinations. As a student, the artist has created a number of iconic works. Many books were produced with her illustrations, including The Georgian Folk Tales and The Knight in the Panther's Skin by Shota Rustaveli (Moscow-Paris co-edition), the last one became her diploma work.

== The work on the illustrations for the Gospel ==
With the blessing of Catholicos-Patriarch of All Georgia Ilia II, a group of theologians, scholars and artists started to create the largest handwritten Bible in the Old Georgian language.

Rusudan was the head of the artists' group, who was creating the miniatures for the Gospel of Matthew for almost three years.

Today, one hundred kilos Bible, made on parchment of the calfskin, is exhibited at the Cathedral of the Holy Trinity in Tbilisi.

== Collaboration with Jaquet Droz ==
In 2020 Rusudan Petviashvili collaborated with luxury Swiss watch brand Jaquet Droz, creating an exclusive wristwatch with her artwork called The Woman with a Bird. The unique pattern was created using Grand Feu enameling method.

== Collaboration with Villeroy & Boch ==
In 2017, Rusudan Petviashvili collaborated with luxury German ceramics and tableware brand Villeroy & Boch. In particular, the company manufactured porcelain decorated with her exclusive paintings. The limited edition tableware is called “Love and Harmony in Relationship”. Nicolas Villeroy, the head of the Villeroy & Boch's tableware direction, praised "Rusudan Petviashvili’s delicate colors and distinctive painting technique".

== Importance and recognition ==
The artworks of Rusudan Petviashvili can be seen at the National Museum of Art (Art Museum of Georgia) (Tbilisi), the National Museum of Adjara (Batumi) and the Museum of Arts (Kutaisi).

Petviashvili's paintings are kept in the family collection of such political leaders as George W. Bush, Eduard Shevardnadze, Ilham Aliyev, Margaret Thatcher, writer and screenwriter Tonino Guerra, diplomats Richard Miles and Fabrizio Romano, and at the head office of the World Bank.

Rusudan Petviashvili paintings adorn the presidential palace of Georgia. She is a favorite artist of Mikheil Saakashvili.

“The art of Rusiko turns me to a very good mood, ― said MikheilSaakashvili. ― Maybe someone believes that art should be tragic, but I do not think so. In all these works the struggle between good and evil is depicted, where good always wins".

In 1981, Saint-Jore (France) hosted a scientific conference to explain the phenomenon of painting of Rusudan Petviashvili.

Since 2005, Rusudan is taking a post of advisor at the International Charitable Foundation of the Catholicos-Patriarch of Georgia named Revival and development of spirituality, culture and science, established by the Catholicos-Patriarch of All Georgia Ilia II.

== Technique ==
All artworks created by Rusudan Petviashvili in one technique: drawing performed without detaching from the sheet, in one-touch.

Rusudan Petviashvili has always sought to create large-format paintings, she was looking for the perfect surface, which would not be limited in size unlike paper. She found a silk to be this material.

== Awards and Prizes ==
- Gold medal and the first-degree diploma at the 8th Republican Youth Olympiad of Arts (1975).
- Gold medal and the first-degree diploma at the 10th Republican Youth Olympiad of Arts (1981).
- Gold medal and the first-degree diploma at the 11th Republican Youth Olympiad of Arts (1983).
- Winner of the Young Communist League Award for illustrations of the books The Knight in the Panther's Skin by ShotaRustaveli and The Georgian Folk Tales (1985).
- International award Ambassador of Good Will (2005).
- Order of Honor of the Georgian Republic (2008).
- Presidential Order Shine (2011).

== Solo exhibitions ==
- Tbilisi, Georgia (Children's Art Gallery) ― 1974.
- Moscow, Russia (Palace of Friendship, House of Journalists) ― 1977.
- Moscow, Russia (Permanent Mission of Georgia) ― 1981.
- Tbilisi, Georgia (Children's Art Gallery) ― 1982.
- France, different cities (Georgian Culture Days) ― 1982–1983.
- Paris, France (Georgian Culture Days) ― 1983.
- Budapest, Hungary (National Gallery) ― 1984.
- Tbilisi, Georgia (House of Artists) ― 1984.
- Madrid, Spain (Georgian Culture Days)― 1985.
- Moscow, Russia (XII World Festival of Youth and Students) ― 1985.
- Biberach, Germany (Braith-Mali-Museum) ― 1986.
- Kutaisi, Georgia (State Gallery) ― 1987.
- London, UK (Roy Mails, Fine Paintings) ― 1988.
- Dijon, France (World Industrial Exhibition Pavilion Georgia) ― 1996.
- Tbilisi, Georgia (National Gallery) ― 1997.
- Batumi, Georgia (State Gallery) ― 2002.
- Borjomi, Georgia (International Festival of the Arts) ― 2002.
- Icebergen, Germany (Spiegel Gallery) ― 2005.
- Coesfeld, Germany (Munsterlandfestival-Part 1) ― 2005.
- Bassano del Grappa, Italy (Gallery Palazzo Bonaguro) ― 2006.
- Berlin, Germany (Exhibition Hall BuseHeberer Fromm) ― 2006.
- Minden, Germany (Spiegel Gallery) ― 2007.
- Minden, Germany (Spiegel Gallery) ― 2009.
- Geneva, Switzerland (Exhibition Hall of the UN) ― 2010.
- Geneva, Switzerland (Galerie Daniel Besseiche) ― 2010.
