= Burgers' equation =

Partial differential equation

Solutions of the Burgers equation starting from a Gaussian initial condition $u(x,0)=e^{-x^2/2}$.

N-wave type solutions of the Burgers equation, starting from the initial condition $u(x,0)=e^{-(x-1)^2/2}-e^{-(x+1)^2/2}$.

Burgers' equation or Bateman–Burgers equation is a fundamental partial differential equation and convection–diffusion equation occurring in various areas of applied mathematics, such as fluid mechanics, nonlinear acoustics, gas dynamics, traffic flow, and mathematical physics. Burgers' equation also plays an important role in studies of the stability and dynamics of one-dimensional solitons with respect to nonlinear transverse perturbations of finite wavelength, since such perturbations are described by the Shrira-Pesenson equation, which, in the one-way wave approximation, reduces to Burgers' equation when the underlying soliton is stable. Bateman-Burgers equation was first introduced by Harry Bateman in 1915 and later studied by Johannes Martinus Burgers in 1948. For a given field $u(x,t)$ and diffusion coefficient (or kinematic viscosity, as in the original fluid mechanical context) $\nu$, the general form of Burgers' equation (also known as viscous Burgers' equation) in one space dimension is the dissipative system:

$$\frac{\partial u}{\partial t} + u \frac{\partial u}{\partial x} = \nu\frac{\partial^2 u}{\partial x^2}.$$

The term $u\partial u/\partial x$ can also be rewritten as $\partial(u^2/2)/\partial x$. When the diffusion term is absent (i.e. $\nu=0$), Burgers' equation becomes the inviscid Burgers' equation:

$$\frac{\partial u}{\partial t} + u \frac{\partial u}{\partial x} = 0,$$

which is a prototype for conservation equations that can develop discontinuities (shock waves).

The reason for the formation of sharp gradients for small values of $\nu$ becomes intuitively clear when one examines the left-hand side of the equation. The term $\partial/\partial t + u \partial/\partial x$ is evidently a wave operator describing a wave propagating in the positive $x$-direction with a speed $u$. Since the wave speed is $u$, regions exhibiting large values of $u$ will be propagated rightwards quicker than regions exhibiting smaller values of $u$; in other words, if $u$ is decreasing in the $x$-direction, initially, then larger $u$'s that lie in the backside will catch up with smaller $u$'s on the front side. The role of the right-side diffusive term is essentially to stop the gradient becoming infinite.

== Inviscid Burgers' equation ==
The inviscid Burgers' equation is a conservation equation, more generally a first order quasilinear hyperbolic equation. The solution to the equation and along with the initial condition

$$\frac{\partial u}{\partial t} + u \frac{\partial u}{\partial x} = 0, \quad u(x,0) = f(x)$$

can be constructed by the method of characteristics. Let $t$ be the parameter characterising any given characteristics in the $x$-$t$ plane, then the characteristic equations are given by

$$\frac{dx}{dt} = u, \quad \frac{du}{dt}=0.$$

Integration of the second equation tells us that $u$ is constant along the characteristic and integration of the first equation shows that the characteristics are straight lines, i.e.,

$$u=c, \quad x = ut + \xi$$

where $\xi$ is the point (or parameter) on the x-axis (t = 0) of the x-t plane from which the characteristic curve is drawn. Since $u$ at $x$-axis is known from the initial condition and the fact that $u$ is unchanged as we move along the characteristic emanating from each point $x=\xi$, we write $u=c=f(\xi)$ on each characteristic. Therefore, the family of trajectories of characteristics parametrized by $\xi$ is

$$x=f(\xi) t+ \xi.$$

Thus, the solution is given by

$$u(x,t) = f(\xi) = f(x-ut), \quad \xi = x - f(\xi) t.$$

This is an implicit relation that determines the solution of the inviscid Burgers' equation provided characteristics don't intersect. If the characteristics do intersect, then a classical solution to the PDE does not exist and leads to the formation of a shock wave. Whether characteristics can intersect or not depends on the initial condition. In fact, the breaking time before a shock wave can be formed is given by

$$t_b = \frac{-1}{\inf_x \left(f^\prime(x)\right)}.$$

=== Complete integral of the inviscid Burgers' equation ===
The implicit solution described above containing an arbitrary function $f$ is called the general integral. However, the inviscid Burgers' equation, being a first-order partial differential equation, also has a complete integral which contains two arbitrary constants (for the two independent variables). Subrahmanyan Chandrasekhar provided the complete integral in 1943, which is given by

$$u(x,t) = \frac{ax+b}{at+1}.$$

where $a$ and $b$ are arbitrary constants. The complete integral satisfies a linear initial condition, i.e., $f(x) = ax + b$. One can also construct the general integral using the above complete integral.

== Viscous Burgers' equation ==
The viscous Burgers' equation can be converted to a linear equation by the Cole–Hopf transformation,

$$u(x,t) = -2 \nu \frac{\partial}{\partial x}\ln \varphi(x,t),$$

which turns it into the equation

$$2 \nu \frac{\partial}{\partial x}\left[\frac{1}{\varphi}\left(\frac{\partial\varphi}{\partial t}- \nu \frac{\partial^2\varphi}{\partial x^2}\right)\right]=0,$$

which can be integrated with respect to $x$ to obtain

$$\frac{\partial\varphi}{\partial t}- \nu \frac{\partial^2\varphi}{\partial x^2}=\varphi \frac{df(t)}{dt},$$

where $df/dt$ is an arbitrary function of time. Introducing the transformation $\varphi\to \varphi e^f$ (which does not affect the function $u(x,t)$), the required equation reduces to that of the heat equation

$$\frac{\partial\varphi}{\partial t}= \nu \frac{\partial^2\varphi}{\partial x^2}.$$

The diffusion equation can be solved. That is, if $\varphi(x,0)=\varphi_0(x)$, then

$$\varphi(x,t) = \frac{1}{\sqrt{4\pi \nu t}}\int_{-\infty}^\infty \varphi_0(x') \exp \left[-\frac{(x-x')^2}{4\nu t}\right]dx'.$$

The initial function $\varphi_0(x)$ is related to the initial function $u(x,0)=f(x)$ by

$$\ln \varphi_0(x) = - \frac{1}{2\nu}\int_0^x f(x') dx',$$

where the lower limit is chosen arbitrarily. Inverting the Cole–Hopf transformation, we have

$$u(x,t)=-2\nu\frac{\partial}{\partial x}\ln\left\{\frac{1}{\sqrt{4\pi \nu t}}\int_{-\infty}^\infty \exp\left[-\frac{(x-x')^2}{4\nu t} - \frac{1}{2\nu}\int_0^{x'}f(x'')dx''\right]dx'\right\}$$

which simplifies, by getting rid of the time-dependent prefactor in the argument of the logarithm, to

$$u(x,t)=-2\nu\frac{\partial}{\partial x}\ln\left\{\int_{-\infty}^\infty \exp\left[-\frac{(x-x')^2}{4\nu t} - \frac{1}{2\nu}\int_0^{x'}f(x'')dx''\right]dx'\right\}.$$

This solution is derived from the solution of the heat equation for $\varphi$ that decays to zero as $x\to\pm\infty$; other solutions for $u$ can be obtained starting from solutions of $\varphi$ that satisfies different boundary conditions.

== Some explicit solutions of the viscous Burgers' equation ==
Explicit expressions for the viscous Burgers' equation are available. Some of the physically relevant solutions are given below:

=== Steadily propagating traveling wave ===
If $u(x,0)=f(x)$ is such that $f(-\infty)=f^+$ and $f(+\infty)=f^-$ and $f'(x)<0$, then we have a traveling-wave solution (with a constant speed $c=(f^++f^-)/2$) given by

$$u(x,t) = c - \frac{f^+-f^-}{2}\tanh\left[\frac{f^+-f^-}{4\nu}(x-ct)\right].$$

This solution, that was originally derived by Harry Bateman in 1915, is used to describe the variation of pressure across a weak shock wave. When $f^+=2$ and $f^-=0$ this simplifies to

$$u(x,t)=\frac{2}{1+e^{\frac{x-t}{\nu}}}$$

with $c=1$.

=== Delta function as an initial condition ===
If $u(x,0) = 2\nu \mathrm{Re} \delta(x)$, where $\mathrm{Re}$ (say, the Reynolds number) is a constant, then we have

$$u(x,t)= \sqrt{\frac{\nu}{\pi t}} \left[\frac{(e^\mathrm{Re}-1)e^{-x^2/4\nu t}}{1 + (e^\mathrm{Re}-1) \mathrm{erfc}(x/\sqrt{4\nu t})/2}\right].$$

In the limit $\mathrm{Re}\to 0$, the limiting behaviour is a diffusional spreading of a source and therefore is given by

$$u(x,t) = \frac{2\nu \mathrm{Re}}{\sqrt{4\pi \nu t}} \exp\left(-\frac{x^2}{4\nu t}\right).$$

On the other hand, In the limit $\mathrm{Re}\to \infty$, the solution approaches that of the aforementioned Chandrasekhar's shock-wave solution of the inviscid Burgers' equation and is given by

$$u(x,t) = \begin{cases}\frac{x}{t}, \quad 0<x<\sqrt{2\nu \mathrm{Re}\,t},\\
0, \quad \text{otherwise}.\end{cases}$$

The shock wave location and its speed are given by $x=\sqrt{2\nu \mathrm{Re}\, t}$ and $\sqrt{\nu \mathrm{Re}/t}.$

=== N-wave solution ===
The N-wave solution comprises a compression wave followed by a rarefaction wave. A solution of this type is given by

$$u(x,t) = \frac{x}{t}\left[1 + \frac{1}{e^{\mathrm{Re}_0-1}}\sqrt{\frac{t}{t_0}}\exp\left(-\frac{\mathrm{Re}(t)x^2}{4\nu \mathrm{Re}_0 t}\right)\right]^{-1}$$

where $\mathrm{Re}_0$ may be regarded as an initial Reynolds number at time $t=t_0$ and $\mathrm{Re}(t) = (1/2\nu) \int_0^\infty udx=\ln (1+\sqrt{\tau/t})$ with $\tau = t_0 \sqrt{e^{\mathrm{Re}_0}-1}$, may be regarded as the time-varying Reynolds number.

== Other forms ==
=== Multi-dimensional Burgers' equation ===
In two or more dimensions, the Burgers' equation becomes

$$\frac{\partial u}{\partial t} + u \cdot \nabla u = \nu \nabla^2 u.$$

One can also extend the equation for the vector field $\mathbf u$, as in

$$\frac{\partial \mathbf u}{\partial t} + \mathbf u \cdot \nabla \mathbf u = \nu \nabla^2 \mathbf u.$$

=== Generalized Burgers' equation ===
The generalized Burgers' equation extends the quasilinear convective to more generalized form, i.e.,

$$\frac{\partial u}{\partial t} + c(u) \frac{\partial u}{\partial x} = \nu\frac{\partial^2 u}{\partial x^2}.$$

where $c(u)$ is any arbitrary function of u. The inviscid $\nu=0$ equation is still a quasilinear hyperbolic equation for $c(u)>0$ and its solution can be constructed using method of characteristics as before.

=== Stochastic Burgers' equation ===
Added space-time noise $\eta(x,t) = \dot W(x,t)$, where $W$ is an $L^2(\mathbb R)$ Wiener process, forms a stochastic Burgers' equation

$$\frac{\partial u}{\partial t} + u \frac{\partial u}{\partial x} = \nu \frac{\partial^2 u}{\partial x^2}-\lambda\frac{\partial\eta}{\partial x}.$$

This stochastic PDE is the one-dimensional version of Kardar–Parisi–Zhang equation in a field $h(x,t)$ upon substituting $u(x,t)=-\lambda\partial h/\partial x$.

== See also ==
- Chaplygin's equation
- Conservation equation
- Euler–Tricomi equation
- Fokker–Planck equation
- KdV-Burgers equation
- KdV-Burgers-Fisher equation
- Euler–Arnold equation
