= Juan Mario Restrepo =

American mathematician

Juan M. Restrepo
- Born: September 4, 1961 (age 65); Bogotá, Colombia
- Education: New York University; Columbia University; Pennsylvania State University
- Known for: Ocean transport, wave-current interactions; Data assimilation, estimation using dynamics and observations, Climate predictions under uncertainty.
- Scientific career
- Fields: Mathematics
- Workplaces: Oak Ridge National Laboratory, Oregon State University, University of Arizona, UCLA, Argonne National Laboratory
- Thesis: Three-dimensional Model for the Formation of Longshore Sand Ridges on the Continental Shelf (1992)
- Doctoral advisor: Jerry L. Bona
- Doctoral students: Emily Lane

Juan Mario Restrepo (born September 4, 1961) is an American mathematician recognized for his contributions to ocean dynamics, data assimilation, and computational statistical mechanics. In ocean dynamics Restrepo is best known for his work in wave–current interaction. He was first to introduce the use of stochastic processes to capture wave breaking dissipation, provided fundamental understanding of transient wave transport and predicted the phenomenon of 'sticky waters' in nearshore waters. He is the son of the Colombian artist Pedro Restrepo.

== Education and career ==
Restrepo majored in music at New York University, graduating in 1983. After studying electrical engineering at Columbia University, he earned a master's degree in engineering acoustics at the Pennsylvania State University in 1987, where he completed a Ph.D. in physics in 1992. His dissertation, Model for the Formation and Evolution of Sand Ridges on the Continental Shelf, was supervised by Jerry L. Bona.

After postdoctoral research at the Argonne National Laboratory and University of California, Los Angeles, he became an assistant professor of mathematics at the University of Arizona in 1997. He moved up the ranks to full professor in 2009, also adding joint appointments in physics and atmospheric science. From 2014 to 2020 he was a professor of mathematics at Oregon State University, with joint appointments in the Department of Statistics and in the Department of Oceans and Atmospheres. He moved to Oak Ridge National Laboratory in 2020, to become Distinguished Member of the R&D Staff, and section head for the Mathematics and Computation Section.

He has served as vice chair of Society for Industrial and Applied Mathematics (SIAM) Geosciences Section, chair of the American Physical Society Focus Group on Climate, President of the Nonlinear Geophysics Section at American Geophysical Union, and many committee assignments in SIAM. He is an associate editor at the International Journal of Uncertainty Quantification, Nonlinear Processes in Geophysics, and Foundations of Data Sciences. He is also Joint Faculty Professor in the Mathematics Department at the University of Tennessee, Knoxville.

== Recognition ==
Restrepo's awards include the Society for Industrial and Applied Mathematics (SIAM), Geosciences Career Prize 2017, and a Department of Energy Young Investigator Award, 2003. He is a fellow of SIAM, and a fellow of the American Physical Society.
