= Method of quantum characteristics =

Quantum characteristics are phase-space trajectories that arise in the phase space formulation of quantum mechanics through the Wigner transform of Heisenberg operators of canonical coordinates and momenta. These trajectories obey the Hamilton equations in quantum form and play the role of characteristics in terms of which time-dependent Weyl's symbols of quantum operators can be expressed. In the classical limit, quantum characteristics reduce to classical trajectories. The knowledge of quantum characteristics is equivalent to the knowledge of quantum dynamics.

== Weyl–Wigner association rule ==
In Hamiltonian dynamics, classical systems with $n$ degrees of freedom are described by $2n$ canonical coordinates and momenta
$$\xi^{i} = (x^1, \ldots , x^n, p_1, \ldots , p_n) \in \R^{2n},$$
that form a coordinate system in the phase space. These variables satisfy the Poisson bracket relations
$$\{\xi^{k},\xi^{l}\}=-I^{kl}.$$
The skew-symmetric matrix $I^{kl}$,

$$\left\| I\right\| =
\begin{Vmatrix}
0 & -E_{n} \\
E_{n} & 0
\end{Vmatrix},$$

where $E_n$ is the $n \times n$ identity matrix, defines nondegenerate 2-form in the phase space. The phase space acquires thereby the structure of a symplectic manifold. The phase space is not metric space, so distance between two points is not defined. The Poisson bracket of two functions can be interpreted as the oriented area of a parallelogram whose adjacent sides are gradients of these functions. Rotations in Euclidean space leave the distance between two points invariant. Canonical transformations in symplectic manifold leave the areas invariant.

In quantum mechanics, the canonical variables $\xi$ are associated to operators of canonical coordinates and momenta

$$\hat{\xi}^{i} = (\hat{x}^1, \ldots , \hat{x}^n, \hat{p}_1, \ldots , \hat{p}_n) \in \operatorname{Op}(L^2(\R^n)).$$

These operators act in Hilbert space and obey commutation relations

$$[\hat{\xi}^{k},\hat{\xi}^{l}] = -i\hbar I^{kl}.$$

Weyl’s association rule extends the correspondence $\xi^i \rightarrow \hat{\xi}^i$ to arbitrary phase-space functions and operators.

=== Taylor expansion ===
A one-sided association rule $f(\xi) \to \hat{f}$ was formulated by Weyl initially with the help of Taylor expansion of functions of operators of the canonical variables

$$\hat{f} = f(\hat{\xi}) \equiv \sum_{s=0}^{\infty } \frac{1}{s!}
\frac{\partial ^{s}f(0)}{\partial \xi^{i_1}\ldots\partial \xi ^{i_s}} \hat{\xi}^{i_1} \ldots \hat{\xi}^{i_s}.$$

The operators $\hat{\xi}$ do not commute, so the Taylor expansion is not defined uniquely. The above prescription uses the symmetrized products of the operators. The real functions correspond to the Hermitian operators. The function $f(\xi)$ is called Weyl's symbol of operator $\hat{f}$.

Under the reverse association $f(\xi) \leftarrow \hat{f}$, the density matrix turns to the Wigner function. Wigner functions have numerous applications in quantum many-body physics, kinetic theory, collision theory, quantum chemistry.

A refined version of the Weyl–Wigner association rule was proposed by Groenewold and Stratonovich.

=== Operator basis ===
The set of operators acting in the Hilbert space is closed under multiplication of operators by $c$-numbers and summation. Such a set constitutes a vector space $\mathbb{V}$. The association rule formulated with the use of the Taylor expansion preserves operations on the operators. The correspondence can be illustrated with the following diagram:
$$\left.
\begin{array}{c}
\begin{array}{c}
\left.
\begin{array}{ccc}
f(\xi ) & \longleftrightarrow  & \hat{f} \\
g(\xi ) & \longleftrightarrow  & \hat{g} \\
c\times f(\xi ) & \longleftrightarrow  & c \times \hat{f} \\
f(\xi )+g(\xi ) & \longleftrightarrow  & \hat{f} + \hat{g}
\end{array}
\right\} \;\text{vector space}\;\; \mathbb{V}
\end{array}
\\
\begin{array}{ccc}
{ f(\xi )\star g(\xi )} & {\longleftrightarrow}  & \;\; { \hat{f}\hat{g} }
\end{array}
\;\;\;\;\;\;\;\;\;\;\;\;\;\;\;\;\;\;\;\;\;\;\;\;\;\;\;\;\;
\end{array}
\right\} {\text{algebra}}$$
Here, $f(\xi)$ and $g(\xi)$ are functions,$\hat{f}$ and $\hat{g}$ are the associated operators, and $\star$ is the star product defined in the next section.

The elements of basis of $\mathbb V$ are labelled by canonical variables $\xi^i \in (- \infty , + \infty)$. The commonly used Groenewold-Stratonovich basis looks like

$$\hat{B}(\xi )= \int \frac{d^{2n}\eta }{(2\pi \hbar )^{n}}
\exp (-\frac{i}{\hbar }\eta _{k}(\xi - \hat{\xi})^{k}) \in \mathbb{V}.$$

The Weyl–Wigner two-sided association rule for function $f(\xi)$ and operator $\hat{f}$ has the form

$$f(\xi )=\operatorname{Tr}[\hat{B}(\xi )\hat{f}],$$
$$\hat{f} =\int \frac{d^{2n}\xi }{(2\pi \hbar )^n}f(\xi)\hat{B}(\xi ).$$

The function $f(\xi)$ provides coordinates of the operator $\hat{f}$ in the basis $\hat{B}(\xi )$. The basis is complete and orthogonal:
$$\int \frac{d^{2n}\xi }{(2\pi \hbar )^n}\hat{B}(\xi )\operatorname{Tr}[\hat{B}(\xi )\hat{f}] =\hat{f},$$
$$\operatorname{Tr}[\hat{B}(\xi )\hat{B}(\xi ^{\prime })] = (2\pi \hbar )^{n}\delta^{2n}(\xi -\xi ^{\prime }).$$

Alternative operator bases are discussed also. The freedom in choice of the operator basis is better known as the operator ordering problem. The coordinates of particle trajectories in phase space depend on the operator basis.

== Star-product ==
The set of operators Op(L^{2}(R^{n})) is closed under the multiplication of operators. The vector space $\mathbb{V}$ is endowed thereby with an associative algebra structure. Given two functions
$$f(\xi ) = \mathrm{Tr}[\hat{B}(\xi )\hat{f}]~~\mathrm{and}~~g(\xi ) = \mathrm{Tr}[\hat{B}(\xi )\hat{g}],$$
one can construct a third function,
$$f(\xi )\star g(\xi ) = \mathrm{Tr}[\hat{B}(\xi )\hat{f}\hat{g}]$$
called the $\star$-product. It is given explicitly by
$$f(\xi )\star g(\xi )=f(\xi )\exp (\frac{i\hbar }{2}\mathcal{P})g(\xi ),$$
where
$$\mathcal{P} = -{I}^{kl}
\overleftarrow{
\frac{\partial} {\partial \xi^{k}}
}
\overrightarrow{
\frac{\partial} {\partial \xi^{l}}}$$
is the Poisson operator. The $\star$-product splits into symmetric and skew-symmetric parts,
$$f\star g=f\circ g+\frac{i\hbar}{2}  f\wedge g.$$

In the classical limit, the $\circ$-product becomes the dot product. The skew-symmetric part $f \wedge g$ is known as the Moyal bracket. This is the Weyl symbol of the commutator. In the classical limit, the Moyal bracket becomes the Poisson bracket. The Moyal bracket is a quantum deformation of the Poisson bracket. The $\star$-product is associative, whereas the $\circ$-product and the Moyal bracket are not associative.

== Quantum characteristics ==
The correspondence $\xi \leftrightarrow \hat{\xi}$ shows that coordinate transformations in the phase space are accompanied by transformations of operators of the canonical coordinates and momenta and vice versa. Let $\mathbf{\hat{U}}$ be the evolution operator,
$$\hat{U} = \exp\Bigl(-\frac{i}{\hbar} \hat{H}\tau \Bigr),$$
and $\hat{H}$ be the Hamiltonian. Consider the following scheme,
$$\begin{align}
&{} \, \xi \stackrel{q} \longrightarrow \, \acute{\xi} \\
&{} \updownarrow   \;\;\;\;\;\;          \updownarrow \\
&{} \, \hat{\xi}  \stackrel{\hat{U}}\longrightarrow \acute{\hat{\xi}}
\end{align}$$

Quantum evolution transforms vectors in the Hilbert space and, under the Wigner association map, coordinates in the phase space. In the Heisenberg representation, the operators of the canonical variables transform as
$$\hat{\xi}^{i} \rightarrow \acute{\hat{\xi}^{i}}=\hat{U}^{\dagger}\hat{\xi}^{i}\hat{U}.$$
The phase-space coordinates $\acute{\xi}^{i}$ that correspond to new operators $\acute{\hat{\xi}^{i}}$ in the old basis $\hat{B}(\xi)$ are given by
$$\xi^{i} \rightarrow \acute{\xi}^{i} = q^{i}(\xi,\tau) = \mathrm{Tr}[\hat{B}(\xi ) \hat{U}^{\dagger} \hat{\xi}^{i}  \hat{U}],$$
with the initial conditions
$$q^{i}(\xi,0)=\xi^{i}.$$
The functions $q^{i}(\xi,\tau)$ specify the quantum phase flow. In the general case, it is canonical to first order in τ.

=== Star-functions ===
The set of operators of canonical variables is complete in the sense that any operator can be represented as a function of operators $\hat{\xi}$. Transformations
$$\hat{f} \rightarrow \acute{\hat{f}} = \hat{U}^{\dagger}\hat{f}\hat{U}$$
induce, under the Wigner association rule, transformations of phase-space functions,
$$\begin{align}
&{} f(\xi) \stackrel{q}\longrightarrow \acute{f}(\xi) = \mathrm{Tr}[\hat{B}(\xi )\hat{U}^{\dagger}\hat{f}\hat{U}] \\
&{} \updownarrow   \;\;\;\;\;\;\;\;\;\;\,                        \updownarrow \\
&{} \hat{f} \;\;\;\; \stackrel{\hat{U}} \longrightarrow \,\acute{\hat{f}} \;\;\;\;\; =\hat{U}^{\dagger}\hat{f}\hat{U}
\end{align}$$

Using the Taylor expansion, the transformation of function $f(\xi )$ under evolution can be found to be
$$f(\xi ) \rightarrow \acute{f}(\xi ) \equiv \mathrm{Tr}[\hat{B}(\xi )\hat{U^{\dagger}}f(\hat{\xi})\hat{U}] =\sum_{s=0}^{\infty }\frac{1}{s!}\frac{\partial ^{s}f(0)}{\partial \xi
^{i_1}\ldots\partial \xi ^{i_s}}q^{i_1}(\xi,\tau )\star \ldots\star q^{i_s}(\xi,\tau) \equiv f(\star q(\xi ,\tau)).$$
The composite function defined in such a way is called $\star$-function.

The composition law differs from the classical one. However, the semiclassical expansion of $f(\star q(\xi,\tau ))$ around $f(q(\xi ,\tau))$ is formally well defined and involves even powers of $\hbar$ only. This equation shows that, given how quantum characteristics are constructed, the physical observables can be found without further reference to the Hamiltonian. The functions $q^{i}(\xi ,\tau)$ play the role of characteristics, similarly to the classical characteristics used to solve the classical Liouville equation.

=== The quantum Liouville equation ===
The Wigner transform of the evolution equation for the density matrix in the Schrödinger representation leads to a quantum Liouville equation for the Wigner function. The Wigner transform of the evolution equation for operators in the Heisenberg representation,
$$\frac{\partial }{\partial \tau} \hat{f} = -\frac{i}{\hbar}[\hat{f},\hat{H}],$$
leads to the same equation with the opposite (plus) sign in the right-hand side:
$$\frac{\partial }{\partial \tau} f(\xi,\tau) = f(\xi,\tau) \wedge H(\xi ).$$
$\star$-function solves this equation in terms of quantum characteristics:
$$f(\xi ,\tau)=f(\star q(\xi ,\tau),0).$$
Similarly, the evolution of the Wigner function in the Schrödinger representation is given by
$$W(\xi ,\tau)=W(\star q(\xi ,- \tau),0).$$
The Liouville theorem of classical mechanics fails, to the extent that, locally, the phase space volume is not preserved in time. In fact, the quantum phase flow does not preserve all differential forms $\omega^{2s}$ defined by exterior powers of $\omega^2 = I^{kl}d\xi_k \curlywedge d\xi_l$.

The Wigner function represents a quantum system in a more general form than the wave function. Wave functions describe pure states, while the Wigner function characterizes ensembles of quantum states. Any Hermitian operator can be diagonalized:

$$\hat{f} = \sum_{s}\lambda_s |s \rangle \langle s|.$$

Those operators whose eigenvalues $\lambda_s$ are non-negative and sum to a finite number can be mapped to density matrices, i.e., to some physical states. The Wigner function is an image of the density matrix, so the Wigner functions admit a similar decomposition:

$$W(\xi) = \sum_{s}\lambda_s W_s(\xi),$$

with $\lambda_s \ge 0$ and

$$W_s(\xi) \star W_r(\xi) = \delta_{sr}W_s(\xi).$$

=== Quantum Hamilton's equations ===
The Quantum Hamilton's equations can be obtained applying the Wigner transform to the evolution equations for Heisenberg operators of canonical coordinates and momenta,
$$\frac{\partial }{\partial \tau }q^{i}(\xi ,\tau ) = \{\zeta^i, H(\zeta)\}|_{\zeta =\star q(\xi ,\tau )}.$$

The right-hand side is calculated like in the classical mechanics. The composite function is, however, $\star$-function. The $\star$-product violates canonicity of the phase flow beyond the first order in $\tau$.

=== Conservation of Moyal bracket ===
The antisymmetrized products of even number of operators of canonical variables are c-numbers as a consequence of the commutation relations. These products are left invariant by unitary transformations, which leads, in particular, to the relation

$$q^{i}(\xi,\tau)\wedge q^j (\xi,\tau)=\xi^i \wedge \xi^j = - I^{ij}.$$

In general, the antisymmetrized product

$$q^{[i_1} (\xi,\tau) \star q^{i_2} (\xi,\tau) \star \ldots \star q^{i_{2s}]} (\xi,\tau)$$

is also invariant, that is, it does not depend on time, and moreover does not depend on the coordinate.

Phase-space transformations induced by the evolution operator preserve the Moyal bracket and do not preserve the Poisson bracket, so the evolution map

$$\xi \rightarrow \acute{\xi} = q(\xi,\tau),$$

is not canonical beyond O(τ). The first order in τ defines the algebra of the transformation group. As previously noted, the algebra of canonical transformations of classical mechanics coincides with the algebra of unitary transformations of quantum mechanics. These two groups, however, are different because the multiplication operations in classical and quantum mechanics are different.

Transformation properties of canonical variables and phase-space functions under unitary transformations in the Hilbert space have important distinctions from the case of canonical transformations in the phase space.

=== Composition law ===
Quantum characteristics can hardly be treated visually as trajectories along which physical particles move. The reason lies in the star-composition law
$$q(\xi ,\tau_1 + \tau_2 ) = q(\star q(\xi ,\tau_1 ),\tau_2),$$
which is non-local and is distinct from the dot-composition law of classical mechanics.

=== Energy conservation ===
The energy conservation implies
$$H(\xi)=H(\star q(\xi ,\tau )),$$
where
$$H(\xi )= \mathrm{Tr}[\hat{B}(\xi )\hat{H}]$$
is Hamilton's function. In the usual geometric sense, $H(\xi )$ is not conserved along quantum characteristics.

== Summary ==
The origin of the method of characteristics can be traced back to Heisenberg’s matrix mechanics. Suppose that we have solved in the matrix mechanics the evolution equations for the operators of the canonical coordinates and momenta in the Heisenberg representation. These operators evolve according to
$$\hat{\xi}^{i} \rightarrow \hat{\xi}^{i}(\tau)=\hat{U}^{\dagger}\hat{\xi}^{i}\hat{U}.$$
It is known that for any operator $\hat{f}$ one can find a function f (ξ) through which $\hat{f}$ is represented in the form $f(\hat{\xi})$. The same operator $\hat{f}$ at time τ is equal to
$$\hat{f}(\tau) = \hat{U}^{\dagger}\hat{f}\hat{U} = \hat{U}^{\dagger} f(\hat{\xi})\hat{U} = f(\hat{U}^{\dagger} \hat{\xi}\hat{U} ) = f(\hat{\xi}(\tau)).$$
This equation shows that $\hat{\xi}(\tau)$ are characteristics that determine the evolution for all of the operators in Op(L^{2}(R^{n})). This property is fully transferred to the phase space upon deformation quantization and, in the limit of ħ → 0, to the classical mechanics.

Classical dynamics vs. Quantum dynamics
Liouville equation
First-order PDE	Infinite-order PDE
$\frac{\partial}{\partial \tau} \rho(\xi,\tau) = - \{ \rho(\xi,\tau), \mathcal{H}(\xi) \}$	$\frac{\partial }{\partial \tau }W(\xi ,\tau ) = - W(\xi ,\tau ) \wedge H(\xi )$
Hamilton's equations
Finite-order ODE	Infinite-order PDE
$\frac{\partial}{\partial \tau} c^{i}(\xi,\tau) = \{\zeta^{i}, \mathcal{H}(\zeta)\}|_{\zeta = c(\xi,\tau)}$	$\frac{\partial }{\partial \tau }q^{i}(\xi ,\tau ) = \{\zeta ^{i},H(\zeta )\}|_{\zeta =\star q(\xi ,\tau )}$
Initial conditions	Initial conditions
$c^{i}(\xi,0) = \xi^{i}$	$q^{i}(\xi,0) = \xi^{i}$
Composition law
Dot-composition	$\star$-composition
$c(\xi ,\tau_1 + \tau_2 ) = c( c(\xi ,\tau_1 ),\tau_2)$	$q(\xi ,\tau_1 + \tau_2 ) = q(\star q(\xi ,\tau_1 ),\tau_2)$
Invariance
Poisson bracket	Moyal bracket
$\{c^i(\xi,\tau), c^j(\xi,\tau)\} = \{\xi^i, \xi^j\}$	$q^i(\xi,\tau)\wedge q^j(\xi,\tau) = \xi^i\wedge \xi^j$
Energy conservation
Dot-composition	$\star$-composition
$H(\xi )=H( c(\xi ,\tau ))$	$H(\xi )=H(\star q(\xi ,\tau ))$
Solution to Liouville equation
Dot-composition	$\star$-composition
$\rho(\xi,\tau) = \rho(c(\xi ,- \tau ),0)$	$W(\xi,\tau) = W(\star q(\xi ,- \tau ),0)$

Table compares properties of characteristics in classical and quantum mechanics. PDE and ODE indicate partial differential equations and ordinary differential equations, respectively. The quantum Liouville equation is the Weyl–Wigner transform of the von Neumann evolution equation for the density matrix in the Schrödinger representation. The quantum Hamilton equations are the Weyl–Wigner transforms of the evolution equations for operators of the canonical coordinates and momenta in the Heisenberg representation.

In classical systems, characteristics $c^i(\xi,\tau)$ usually satisfy first-order ODEs, e.g., classical Hamilton's equations, and solve first-order PDEs, e.g., the classical Liouville equation. Functions $q^i(\xi,\tau)$ are also characteristics, despite both $q^i(\xi,\tau)$ and $f(\xi,\tau)$ obeying infinite-order PDEs.

The quantum phase flow contains all of the information about the quantum evolution. Semiclassical expansion of quantum characteristics and $\star$-functions of quantum characteristics in a power series in ħ allows calculation of the average values of time-dependent physical observables by solving a finite-order coupled system of ODEs for phase space trajectories and Jacobi fields. The order of the system of ODEs depends on the truncation of the power series. The tunneling effect is nonperturbative in ħ and is not captured by the expansion. The density of the quantum probability fluid is not preserved in phase-space, as the quantum fluid diffuses. Quantum characteristics must be distinguished from the trajectories of the De Broglie–Bohm theory, the trajectories of the path-integral method in phase space for the amplitudes and the Wigner function, and the Wigner trajectories. Thus far, only a few quantum systems have been explicitly solved using the method of quantum characteristics.

== See also ==
- Method of characteristics
- Wigner–Weyl transform
- Deformation theory
- Wigner distribution function
- Modified Wigner distribution function
- Wigner quasiprobability distribution
- Negative probability

== Textbooks ==
- H. Weyl, The Theory of Groups and Quantum Mechanics, (Dover Publications, New York Inc., 1931).
- V. I. Arnold, Mathematical Methods of Classical Mechanics, (2-nd ed. Springer-Verlag, New York Inc., 1989).
- M. V. Karasev and V. P. Maslov, Nonlinear Poisson brackets. Geometry and quantization. Translations of Mathematical Monographs, 119. (American Mathematical Society, Providence, RI, 1993).
