= Eric Schechter =

American mathematician

- Born: August 1, 1950 (age 76)
- Education: University of Chicago
- Scientific career
- Fields: Mathematics
- Workplaces: Vanderbilt University
- Doctoral advisor: Jerry L. Bona

Eric Schechter (born August 1, 1950) is an American mathematician, retired from Vanderbilt University with the title of professor emeritus. His interests started primarily in analysis but moved into mathematical logic. Schechter is best known for his 1996 book Handbook of Analysis and its Foundations, which provides a novel approach to mathematical analysis and related topics at the graduate level.

== Important works ==
Schechter has authored a number of articles in analysis, differential equations, mathematical logic, and set theory. He is best known for writing two textbooks covering advanced material but written at an introductory level:

- (2005) Classical and Nonclassical Logics (ISBN 0-691-12279-2) (more information)
- (1996) Handbook of Analysis and its Foundations (ISBN 0126227608) (more information)

Handbook of Analysis and its Foundations was reviewed at length by the Society for Industrial and Applied Mathematics review, which wrote:

Every once in a while a book comes along that so effectively redefines an educational enterprise -- in this case, graduate mathematical training -- and so effectively reexamines the hegemony of ideas prevailing in a discipline -- in this case, mathematical analysis -- that it deserves our careful attention. This is such a book.

Schechter also maintains two webpages that are frequently cited:

- Common Errors in Undergraduate Mathematics
- A Home Page for the Axiom of Choice

== Politics ==
Schechter is involved in political activism of the democratic socialist variety. His mathematical homepage includes a few anti-war statements, and his political home page includes a long essay about progressive ideology. He has worked as an organizer for the Nashville Peace Coalition, protesting the wars in Iraq and Afghanistan. At a meeting for the living wage movement on Vanderbilt's campus, he remarked that it is hard to bring up politics in a non-political environment, and expressed that people did not talk much about politics in the mathematics department at Vanderbilt. His father, Henry Schechter, was a deputy of the AFL-CIO.

In 2010, Schechter ran for Tennessee's 5th Congressional District seat against incumbent congressman Jim Cooper, but was defeated in the Democratic primary. Schechter describes himself as "a different kind of Democrat."
