= Benjamin–Bona–Mahony equation =

Partial differential equation

An animation of the overtaking of two solitary waves according to the Benjamin–Bona–Mahony (BBM) equation. The wave heights of the solitary waves are 1.2 and 0.6, respectively, and their celerities are 1.4 and 1.2. The upper graph is for a frame of reference moving with the average celerity of the solitary waves. The envelope of the overtaking waves is shown in grey: note that the maximum wave height reduces during the interaction. The lower graph (with a different vertical scale and in a stationary frame of reference) shows the oscillatory tail produced by the interaction. Thus, the solitary wave solutions of the BBM equation are not solitons.

The Benjamin–Bona–Mahony equation (BBM equation, also regularized long-wave equation; RLWE) is the partial differential equation

$$u_t+u_x+uu_x-u_{xxt}=0.\,$$

This equation was studied in Benjamin, Bona, and Mahony (1972) as an improvement of the Korteweg–de Vries equation (KdV equation) for modeling long surface gravity waves of small amplitude – propagating uni-directionally in 1+1 dimensions. They show the stability and uniqueness of solutions to the BBM equation. This contrasts with the KdV equation, which is unstable in its high wavenumber components. Further, while the KdV equation has an infinite number of integrals of motion, the BBM equation only has three.

Before, in 1966, this equation was introduced by Peregrine, in the study of undular bores.

A generalized n-dimensional version is given by

$$u_t-\nabla^2u_t+\operatorname{div}\,\varphi(u)=0.\,$$

where $\varphi$ is a sufficiently smooth function from $\mathbb R$ to $\mathbb R^n$. Avrin & Goldstein (1985) proved global existence of a solution in all dimensions.

== Solitary wave solution ==
The BBM equation possesses solitary wave solutions of the form:

$$u = 3 \frac{c^2}{1-c^2} \operatorname{sech}^2 \frac12 \left( cx - \frac{ct}{1-c^2} + \delta \right),$$

where sech is the hyperbolic secant function and $\delta$ is a phase shift (by an initial horizontal displacement). For $|c|<1$, the solitary waves have a positive crest elevation and travel in the positive $x$-direction with velocity $1/(1-c^2).$ These solitary waves are not solitons, i.e. after interaction with other solitary waves, an oscillatory tail is generated and the solitary waves have changed.

== Hamiltonian structure ==
The BBM equation has a Hamiltonian structure, as it can be written as:

$u_t = - \mathcal{D} \frac{\delta H}{\delta u},\,$ with Hamiltonian $H = \int_{-\infty}^{+\infty} \left( \tfrac12 u^2 + \tfrac16 u^3 \right)\, \text{d}x\,$ and operator $\mathcal{D} = \left( 1 - \partial_x^2 \right)^{-1}\, \partial_x.$

Here $\delta H/\delta u$ is the variation of the Hamiltonian $H(u)$ with respect to $u(x),$ and $\partial_x$ denotes the partial differential operator with respect to $x.$

== Conservation laws ==
The BBM equation possesses exactly three independent and non-trivial conservation laws. First $u$ is replaced by $u=-v-1$ in the BBM equation, leading to the equivalent equation:

$$v_t - v_{xxt} = v\, v_x.$$

The three conservation laws then are:

$$\begin{align}
v_t - \left( v_{xt} + \tfrac12 v^2 \right)_x & = 0, \\
\left( \tfrac12 v^2 + \tfrac12 v_x^2 \right)_t - \left( v\, v_{xt} + \tfrac13 v^3 \right)_x & = 0,  \\
\left( \tfrac13 v^3 \right)_t + \left( v_t^2 - v_{xt}^2 - v^2\, v_{xt} - \tfrac14 v^4 \right)_x & = 0.
\end{align}$$

Which can easily expressed in terms of $u$ by using $v=-u-1.$

== Linear dispersion ==
The linearized version of the BBM equation is:

$$u_t + u_x - u_{xxt}=0.$$

Periodic progressive wave solutions are of the form:

$$u = a\, \mathrm{e}^{i (k x-\omega t)},$$

with $k$ the wavenumber and $\omega$ the angular frequency. The dispersion relation of the linearized BBM equation is

$$\omega_\mathrm{BBM} = \frac{k}{1+k^2}.$$

Similarly, for the linearized KdV equation $u_t + u_x + u_{xxx} = 0$ the dispersion relation is:

$$\omega_\mathrm{KdV} = k - k^3.$$

This becomes unbounded and negative for $k\to\infty,$ and the same applies to the phase velocity $\omega_\mathrm{KdV}/k$ and group velocity $\mathrm{d}\omega_\mathrm{KdV}/\mathrm{d}k.$ Consequently, the KdV equation gives waves travelling in the negative $x$-direction for high wavenumbers (short wavelengths). This is in contrast with its purpose as an approximation for uni-directional waves propagating in the positive $x$-direction.

The strong growth of frequency $\omega_\mathrm{KdV}$ and phase speed with wavenumber $k$ posed problems in the numerical solution of the KdV equation, while the BBM equation does not have these shortcomings.
