= Pedro Restrepo =

Colombian artist, civil servant, historian, and writer (1920–2012)

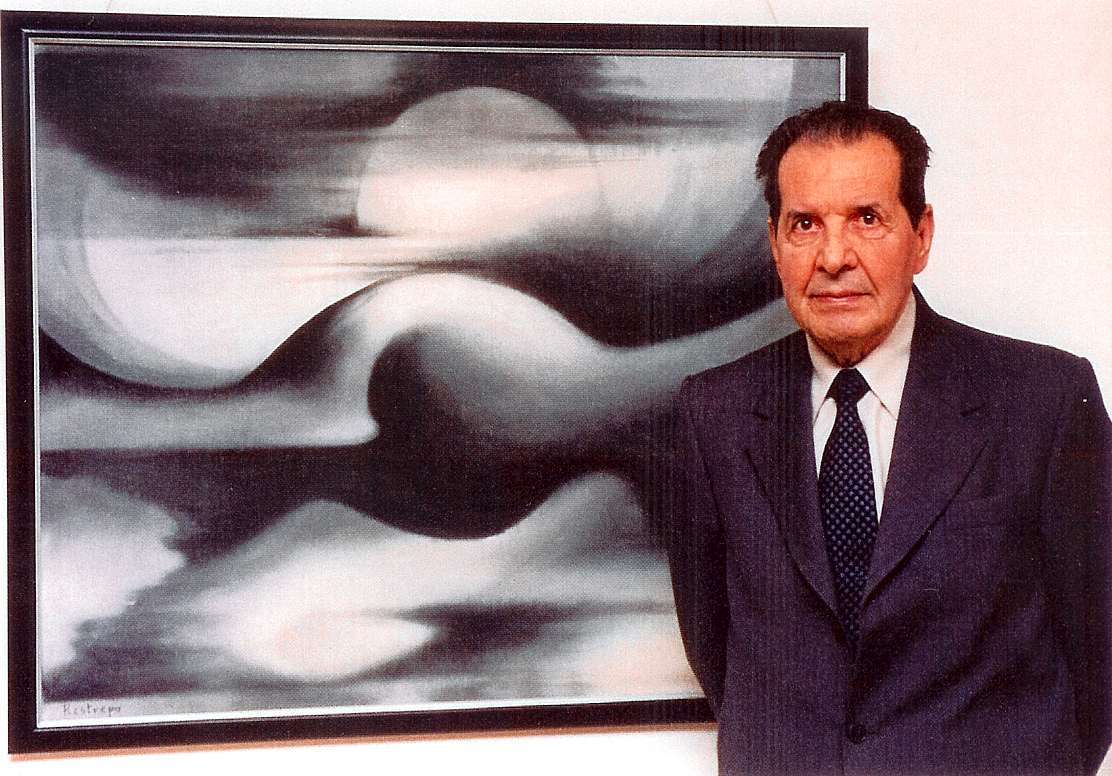
Pedro Restrepo in Jakarta in 2003.

Pedro Pablo Restrepo-Peláez (7 February 1920 – 2012) was a Colombian artist, civil servant, art historian and writer.

== Life ==
A native of Andes Antioquia, Colombia, Restrepo was born in February 1920. He left home at an early age and went to Chile where he graduated from secondary school, and later attended the Universidad de Santiago de Chile. He traveled to Buenos Aires, Argentina, to further his education. His art studies began while in Santiago. Eventually he traveled to Brazil where he studied art at the Escola de Belas Artes, in Rio de Janeiro.

Restrepo-Peláez accepted an offer to represent his country as Vice-Consul in Paris, France. After three years, he traveled to Florence, Italy to become a pupil of Giovanni Colacicchi at the Accademia di Belle Arti during an extended period. After a decade of travel throughout Europe he went to live in Mexico City and Los Angeles, California. He studied restoration and conservation at Real Academia de Bellas Artes de San Fernando, in Madrid, Spain, interning later at the Brooklyn Museum of Art.

He wrote extensively on art as well as on political and historical subjects. His column appeared regularly in El Tiempo, Colombia's principal news publication.

Restrepo-Peláez died in 2012.

=== Education ===
Attended, Universidad de Santiago de Chile and the Escola de Belas Artes, in Rio de Janeiro.

=== Government posts ===
Restrepo-Peláez has held several government posts:

- Private Secretary of the Governor of Antioquia (Colombia)
- Vice Consul of Colombia in Paris
- "Artistic" Mayor of Villa de Leyva (Boyacá, Colombia)
- Mayor of the colonial area of the City of Bogotá - La Candelaria
- Director of "Extension Cultural" (cultural director) of the City of Bogotá
- Professor of Art History of the Escuela Nacional de Arte Dramática (the national school of theater) in Bogotá, Colombia.
- Professor of Art History in the Colegio Odontológico (School of Dentistry) of Bogotá, Colombia.
- Professor of Art History at the Universidad Nacional (National University), Bogotá, Colombia
- Director of the Museo Arqueologico de la Casa del Marques San Jorge (Banco Popular) during twelve years.

Restrepo-Pelaez was knighted, Orden the Caballero de la Reina Isabel, in Spain.

=== Conservation ===
Restrepo-Peláez played an important role in the conservation of colonial architecture and monuments in Colombia. He personally restored the murals in the Casa de Juan de Castellanos in Tunja, Boyacá. The restoration was sponsored by Citibank. He also restored the series of colonial paintings in Sopó, Los Angeles de Sopó (the Angels of Sopó).

=== Other work ===
He exhibited individually in Rio de Janeiro (Galeria Carioca), Mexico City, Paris (Maison De l'Amérique Latine), London, Madrid (Galeria de Arte Moderno), Washington D.C. (Pan American Union), Fort Lauderdale, Florida, Bogotá (Biblioteca Nacional, Biblioteca Luis Angel Arango), Houston, Texas (Colombe D'Or, The Houstonian, Cherqui Gallery), Telluride, Colorado (Elinoff Gallery), and Jakarta at the Colombian consulate.

For several years he explored the possibilities of working exclusively in black and white in search of technical effects usually obtained through the use of color. He was a "minimalist" as it relates to economy of color and subject matter as well as in his use of primitive materials, such as burlap, plywood, and casein paint. Restrepo focused on nudes and still life, save for the period when he was "artistic" Mayor of the colonial town of Villa de Leyva, Colombia, when he did contemporary representations of the town's colonial architecture.

== Publications ==
- La Patria Boba, Cartas de un Colombiano Inconforme, El Homosexualismo en el Arte, Autoretraro.
