= Benjamin–Ono equation =

Integro-differential equation

In mathematics, the Benjamin–Ono equation is a nonlinear partial integro-differential equation that describes one-dimensional internal waves in deep water. It was introduced by Benjamin (1967) and Ono (1975).

The Benjamin–Ono equation is

$$u_t+uu_x+Hu_{xx}=0$$

where H is the Hilbert transform.

It possesses infinitely many conserved densities and symmetries; thus it is a completely integrable system.

== See also ==
- Bretherton equation

== Sources ==
- Benjamin, T. Brooke (1967), "Internal waves of permanent form in fluids of great depth", Journal of Fluid Mechanics, 29 (3): 559, Bibcode:1967JFM....29..559B, doi:10.1017/s002211206700103x, S2CID 123065419
- Ono, Hiroaki (1975), "Algebraic solitary waves in stratified fluids", Journal of the Physical Society of Japan, 39 (4): 1082–1091, Bibcode:1975JPSJ...39.1082O, doi:10.1143/JPSJ.39.1082, MR 0398275
