= Boris Kadomtsev =

Russian physicist (1928–1998)

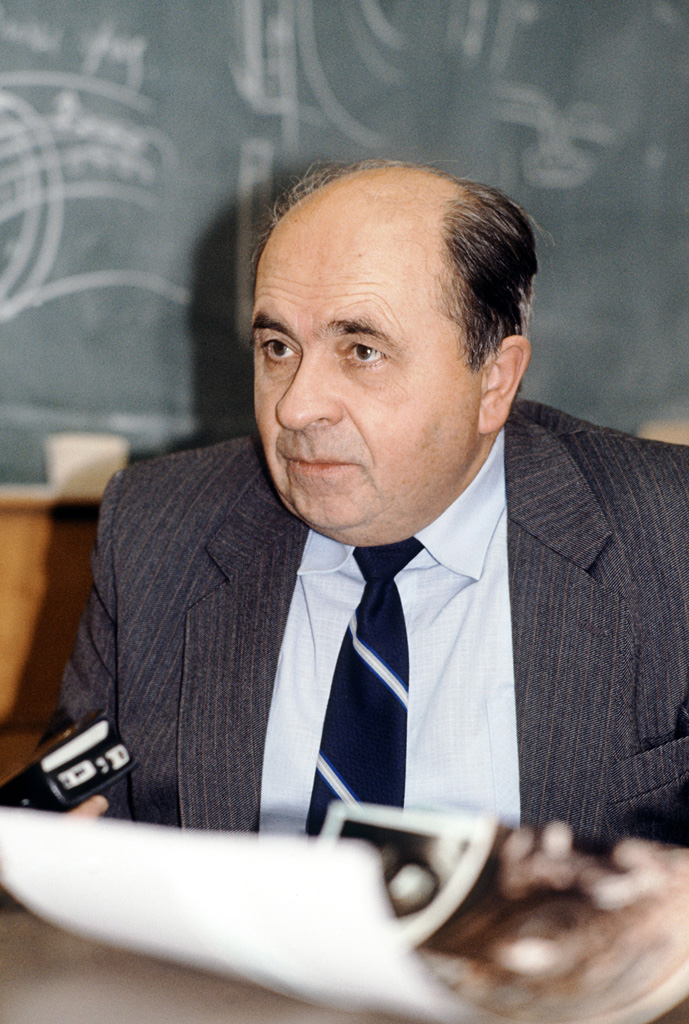
- Kadomtsev in 1989
- Born: Boris Borisovich Kadomtsev; November 9, 1928; Russia
- Died: August 19, 1998 (aged 69)
- Education: Moscow State University
- Awards: USSR State Prize (1970); Lenin Prize (1984); James Clerk Maxwell Prize for Plasma Physics (1998)
- Scientific career
- Fields: Plasma physics

Boris Borisovich Kadomtsev (Russian: Борис Борисович Кадомцев; 9 November 1928 – 19 August 1998) was a Soviet and Russian plasma physicist who worked on controlled fusion problems (e.g. tokamaks). He developed a theory of transport phenomena in turbulent plasmas and a theory of the so-called anomalous behavior of plasmas in magnetic fields. In 1966, he discovered plasma instability with trapped particles.

In 1970, Kadomtsev and Vladimir Petviashvili introduced into plasma physics the Kadomtsev–Petviashvili equation (KP equation), a nonlinear partial differential equation with applications in theoretical physics and complex analysis. The exact solution to the KP equation was later found by Vladimir Zakharov and Alexei Shabat, which helped solve the Schottky problem.

== Early life and career ==
Kadomtsev graduated from Moscow State University in 1951. He then worked at the Institute for Physics and Energy in Obninsk. Starting in 1956, he worked at the Institute for Atomic Energy. From 1976 to 1998, he was the chief editor of the journal Physics-Uspekhi ("Successes in Physics").

From 1973 until his death in 1998, he was the chair of the plasma physics section of the state committee for the use of nuclear energy.

He died on 19 August 1998 and was buried at Troyekurovskoye Cemetery.

== Honors and awards ==
In 1970, he received the USSR State Prize for the study of the instability of a high-temperature plasma in a magnetic field and the creation of a method for its stabilization with a “magnetic well”.

In 1984, he was awarded the Lenin Prize for his work on the "Theory of Thermonuclear Toroidal Plasma".

He was also honored with the Order of the Red Banner of Labour. He has been a corresponding member of the Soviet Academy of Sciences since 1962 and a full member since 1970.

In 1998, he received the American Physical Society's James Clerk Maxwell Prize for Plasma Physics for "fundamental contributions to plasma turbulence theory, stability and nonlinear theory of MHD and kinetic instabilities in plasmas, and for international leadership in research and teaching of plasma physics and controlled thermonuclear fusion physics".

== Books ==
- Kadomtsev, B. B. (1965). Plasma turbulence. Academic Press. OCLC 535369.
- Kadomtsev, B. B. (1981). Plasma physics. Mir Publishers. OCLC 10458765.
- Kadomtsev, B. B. (2010). On the pulsar. World Scientific Pub. Co. ISBN 978-981-4289-74-0. OCLC 630133469.
