= Jerry L. Bona =

American mathematician

Jerry Bona
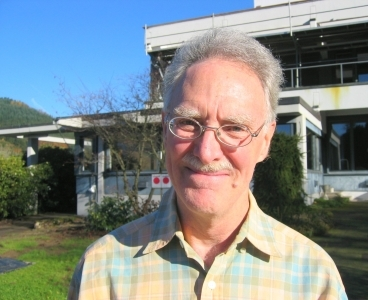
- Jerry Bona in 2006
- Born: February 5, 1945 (age 81); Little Rock, Arkansas, US
- Education: Harvard University
- Scientific career
- Fields: Mathematics
- Workplaces: University of Chicago; The Pennsylvania State University; University of Illinois at Chicago
- Doctoral advisor: Garrett Birkhoff
- Doctoral students: Juan Mario Restrepo; Eric Schechter

Jerry Lloyd Bona (born February 5, 1945) is an American mathematician, known for his work in fluid mechanics, partial differential equations, and computational mathematics, and active in some other branches of pure and applied mathematics.

Bona received his PhD in 1971 from Harvard University under supervision of Garrett Birkhoff and worked from 1970 to 1972 at the Fluid Mechanics Research Institute University of Essex, where along with Brooke Benjamin and J. J. Mahony, he published on Model Equations for Long Waves in Non-linear Dispersive Systems, known as Benjamin–Bona–Mahony equation. He is probably best known for his statement about equivalent statements of the Axiom of Choice: “The Axiom of Choice is obviously true, the Well–ordering theorem is obviously false; and who can tell about Zorn’s Lemma?"

Jerry Bona has worked at University of Chicago, Pennsylvania State University, University of Texas at Austin and is a Professor of Mathematics at the University of Illinois at Chicago. In 2012 he became a fellow of the American Mathematical Society. In 2013 he became a fellow of the Society for Industrial and Applied Mathematics.

== Quotes ==
The Axiom of Choice is obviously true, the well-ordering principle obviously false, and who can tell about Zorn's lemma?

This is a joke: although the three are all mathematically equivalent, many mathematicians find the axiom of choice to be intuitive, the well-ordering principle to be counterintuitive, and Zorn's lemma to be too complex for any intuition.

== Selected publications ==
- with S. M. Sun and Bing-Yu Zhang: Bona, Jerry L.; Sun, S. M.; Zhang, Bing-Yu (2002). "A non-homogeneous boundary-value problem for the Korteweg-de Vries equation in a quarter plane". Trans. Amer. Math. Soc. 354 (2): 427–490. doi:10.1090/s0002-9947-01-02885-9. MR 1862556.

== See also ==
- Benjamin–Bona–Mahony equation
