= Brooke Benjamin =

English mathematical physicist and mathematician

T. Brooke Benjamin
- Brooke Benjamin
- Born: 15 April 1929; Wallasey, England
- Died: 16 August 1995 (aged 66); Oxford, England
- Education: University of Liverpool; Yale University; University of Cambridge
- Known for: Benjamin–Bona–Mahony equation Benjamin–Ono equation Benjamin–Feir instability
- Scientific career
- Fields: Fluid dynamics Mathematical analysis
- Workplaces: University of Cambridge; University of Essex; University of Oxford
- Doctoral students: John Dwyer; Alan Champneys

Thomas Brooke Benjamin, FRS (15 April 1929 – 16 August 1995) was an English mathematical physicist and mathematician, best known for his work in mathematical analysis and fluid mechanics, especially in applications of nonlinear differential equations.

== Education and career ==
Benjamin was educated at Wallasey Grammar School on the Wirral, the University of Liverpool (BEng. 1950) and Yale University (MEng. 1952), before being awarded his doctorate at King's College, Cambridge in 1955. He was a fellow of King's from 1955 to 1964.

From 1979 until his death in 1995 he was Sedleian Professor of Natural Philosophy at the Mathematical Institute, University of Oxford, and a fellow of The Queen's College, Oxford.

== Contributions ==
The Benjamin–Ono equation describes one-dimensional internal waves in deep water. It was introduced by Benjamin in 1967, and later studied also by Hiroaki Ono. Another equation named after Benjamin, the Benjamin–Bona–Mahony equation, models long surface gravity waves of small amplitude. Benjamin studied it with Jerry L. Bona and J. J. Mahony in a 1972 paper.
