= Vladimir Petviashvili =

Soviet and Russian scientists

Vladimir Iosifovich Petviashvili
- ვლადიმერ იოსების ძე ფეტვიაშვილი
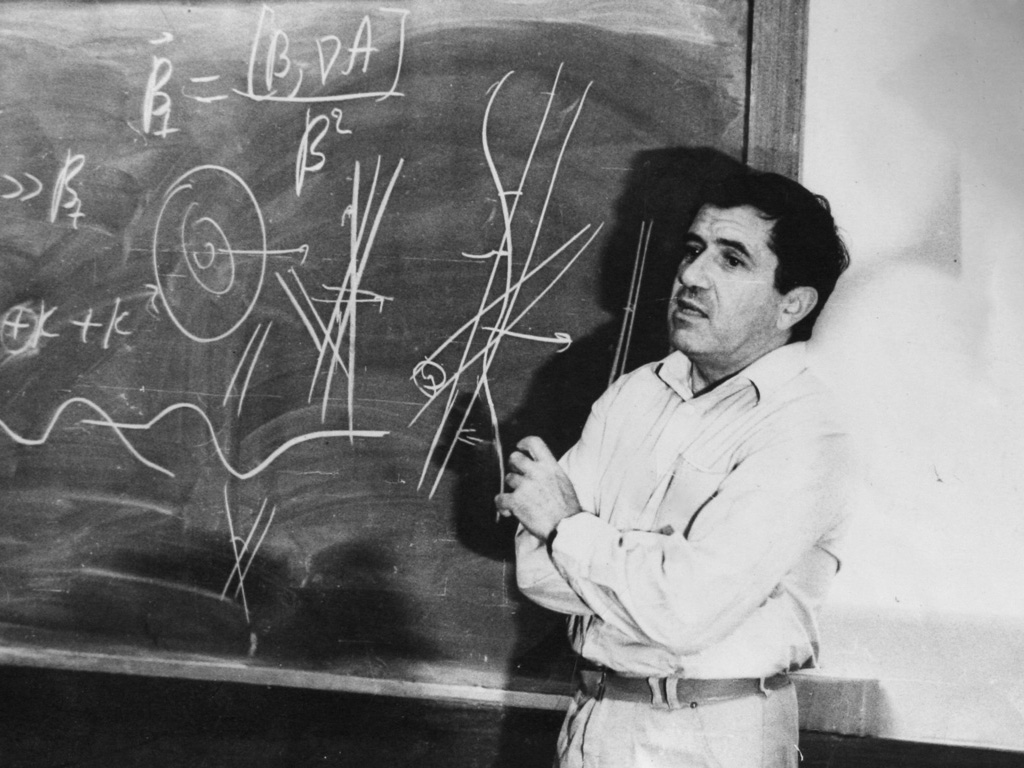
- Education: Tbilisi State University
- Known for: Kadomtsev–Petviashvili equation
- Awards: I. Tamm Prize (1992)
- Scientific career
- Fields: Plasma Physics
- Thesis: The theory of strongly nonlinear waves and solitons in plasma

Vladimir Iosifovich Petviashvili (Петвиашвили Владимир Иосифович; September 12, 1936 – July 21, 1993) was a Soviet physicist from Georgia. Petviashvili graduated from Tbilisi State University in 1959, where he also completed his doctoral studies. In 1963–1965, he was research assistant at the Institute of Physics of the Andronikashvili Academy of Sciences of the Georgian SSR. Since 1965 he worked at the Kurchatov Institute (Institute of Atomic Energy named after I.V. Kurchatov) and at the Moscow Institute of Physics and Technology. In 1992, Petviashvili received the I. Tamm Prize for a series of works on Turbulence and eddy current structures in plasma.

== Biography ==
Petviashvili was born in Tbilisi to a family of scientists in 1936. In 1959, he graduated from Tbilisi State University. After defending his doctoral dissertation in March 1979, Petviashvili expanded his research interests to nonlinear drift waves and drift turbulence, which were critical in the development of the theory of plasmas. Petviashvili showed that drift turbulence can have some regularities in its chaotic structure and consists of structural elements— two-dimensional soliton vortices. He investigated possible mechanisms for the self-generation of these structures and suggested diffusion and heat-conductivity processes involving the mixing of plasma and solitons inside these structures. Seeking extensive applications for his results, Petviashvili put forward the idea of modeling drift turbulence in rapidly rotating shallow waters. He laid the foundations for laboratory experiments employing this idea in his paper 'The Red Spot of Jupiter and Drift Solitons in a Plasma". These experiments have been successfully conducted at the Kurchatov Institute and other scientific research centers around the world.

== Notable work ==
- Candidate dissertation (1963) - "Some questions of the theory of weakly turbulent plasma."
- Boris B. Kadomtsev and V. I. Petviashvili (as well as Vladimir E. Zakharov) obtained and studied integrable nonlinear equations for two-dimensional and three-dimensional waves in plasma containing soliton solutions, known as the Kadomtsev-Petviashvili equation (1970).
- Doctoral dissertation (1978) - "The theory of strongly nonlinear waves and solitons in plasma."
- V. I. Petviashvili and O. A. Pokhotelov (1992) - "Solitary waves in plasma and atmosphere", Gordon & Breach Science Publishers, Reading, ISBN 978-2881247873
- Boris B. Kadomtsev and V. I. Petviashvili (1963) - "Weakly Turbulent Plasma in a Magnetic Field," Soviet Physics JETP, vol 16., no 6., pp. 2234-2244.
