= Electrostatic ion cyclotron wave =

In plasma physics, an electrostatic ion cyclotron wave is a longitudinal oscillation of the ions (and electrons) in a magnetized plasma, propagating nearly (but not exactly) perpendicular to the magnetic field. The angle (in radians) between the direction of propagation and the direction perpendicular to the magnetic field must be greater than about the square root of the mass ratio,

$$\sqrt{\frac{m_e}{m_i}}$$,

in order that the electrons can move along the field lines from crest to trough to satisfy the Boltzmann relation. The dispersion relation is

$\omega^2=\Omega_c^2+k^2v_s^2$,

where Ω_{c} is the ion cyclotron frequency and v_{s} is the ion sound speed. This relation is the result of restoring forces due to the Lorentz force (see Upper hybrid oscillation for more details), the electrostatic force (the T_{e} term in v_{s}), and the ion pressure (the T_{i} term in v_{s}).

== See also ==
- Waves in plasmas
- Ion acoustic wave
- Upper hybrid oscillation
- Lower hybrid oscillation
