= Appleton–Hartree equation =

Mathematical expression

The Appleton–Hartree equation, sometimes also referred to as the Appleton–Lassen equation, is a mathematical expression that describes the refractive index for electromagnetic wave propagation in a cold magnetized plasma. It is named after Edward Victor Appleton and Douglas Hartree.

== History ==
The Appleton–Hartree equation was developed independently by several different scientists, including H. K. Lassen (1926), Edward Victor Appleton (1927,1931), Douglas Hartree (1929, 1931). Lassen's work, that predates the work of Appleton and Hartree, included a more thorough treatment of collisional plasma; but, published only in German, it has not been widely read in the English speaking world of radio physics. Further, regarding the derivation by Appleton, it was noted in the historical study by C. Stewart Gillmor that Wilhelm Altar (while working with Appleton) first calculated the dispersion relation in 1926.

== Equation ==
The dispersion relation can be written as an expression for the frequency (squared), but it is also common to write it as an expression for the index of refraction:

$$n^2 = \left(\frac{ck}{\omega}\right)^2.$$

The full equation is typically given as follows:

$$n^2 = 1 - \frac{X}{1 - iZ - \frac{\frac{1}{2}Y^2\sin^2\theta}{1 - X - iZ} \pm \frac{1}{1 - X - iZ}\left(\frac{1}{4}Y^4\sin^4\theta + Y^2\cos^2\theta\left(1 - X - iZ\right)^2\right)^{1/2}}$$

or, alternatively, with damping term $Z = 0$ and rearranging terms:

$$n^2 = 1 - \frac{X\left(1-X\right)}{1 - X - {\frac{1}{2}Y^2\sin^2\theta} \pm \left(\left(\frac{1}{2}Y^2\sin^2\theta\right)^2 + \left(1-X\right)^2Y^2\cos^2\theta\right)^{1/2}}$$

Definition of terms:

$n$: complex refractive index

$i=\sqrt{-1}$: imaginary unit

$$X = \frac{\omega_0^2}{\omega^2}$$

$$Y = \frac{\omega_H}{\omega}$$

$$Z = \frac{\nu}{\omega}$$

$\nu$: electron collision frequency

$\omega = 2\pi f$: angular frequency

$f$: ordinary frequency (cycles per second, or Hertz)

$\omega_0 = 2\pi f_0 = \sqrt{\frac{Ne^2}{\epsilon_0 m}}$: electron plasma frequency

$\omega_H = 2\pi f_H = \frac{B_0 |e|}{m}$: electron gyro frequency

$\epsilon_0$: permittivity of free space

$B_0$: ambient magnetic field strength

$e$: electron charge

$m$: electron mass

$\theta$: angle between the ambient magnetic field vector and the wave vector

=== Modes of propagation ===
The presence of the $\pm$ sign in the Appleton–Hartree equation gives two separate solutions for the refractive index. For propagation perpendicular to the magnetic field, i.e., $\mathbf k\perp \mathbf B_0$, the '+' sign represents the "ordinary mode," and the '−' sign represents the "extraordinary mode." For propagation parallel to the magnetic field, i.e., $\mathbf k\parallel \mathbf B_0$, the '+' sign represents a left-hand circularly polarized mode, and the '−' sign represents a right-hand circularly polarized mode. See the article on electromagnetic electron waves for more detail.

$\mathbf k$ is the vector of the propagation plane.

== Reduced forms ==
=== Propagation in a collisionless plasma ===
If the electron collision frequency $\nu$ is negligible compared to the wave frequency of interest $\omega$, the plasma can be said to be "collisionless." That is, given the condition

$$\nu \ll \omega$$,

we have

$$Z = \frac{\nu}{\omega} \ll 1$$,

so we can neglect the $Z$ terms in the equation. The Appleton–Hartree equation for a cold, collisionless plasma is therefore,

$$n^2 = 1 - \frac{X}{1 - \frac{\frac{1}{2}Y^2\sin^2\theta}{1 - X} \pm \frac{1}{1 - X}\left(\frac{1}{4}Y^4\sin^4\theta + Y^2\cos^2\theta\left(1 - X\right)^2\right)^{1/2}}$$

=== Quasi-longitudinal propagation in a collisionless plasma ===
If we further assume that the wave propagation is primarily in the direction of the magnetic field, i.e., $\theta \approx 0$, we can neglect the $Y^4\sin^4\theta$ term above. Thus, for quasi-longitudinal propagation in a cold, collisionless plasma, the Appleton–Hartree equation becomes,

$$n^2 = 1 - \frac{X}{1 - \frac{\frac{1}{2}Y^2\sin^2\theta}{1 - X} \pm Y\cos\theta}$$

== See also ==
- Mary Taylor Slow
- Plasma (physics)
- Waves in plasmas
