= Warm–hot intergalactic medium =

Plasma that cosmologists believe exists between galaxies

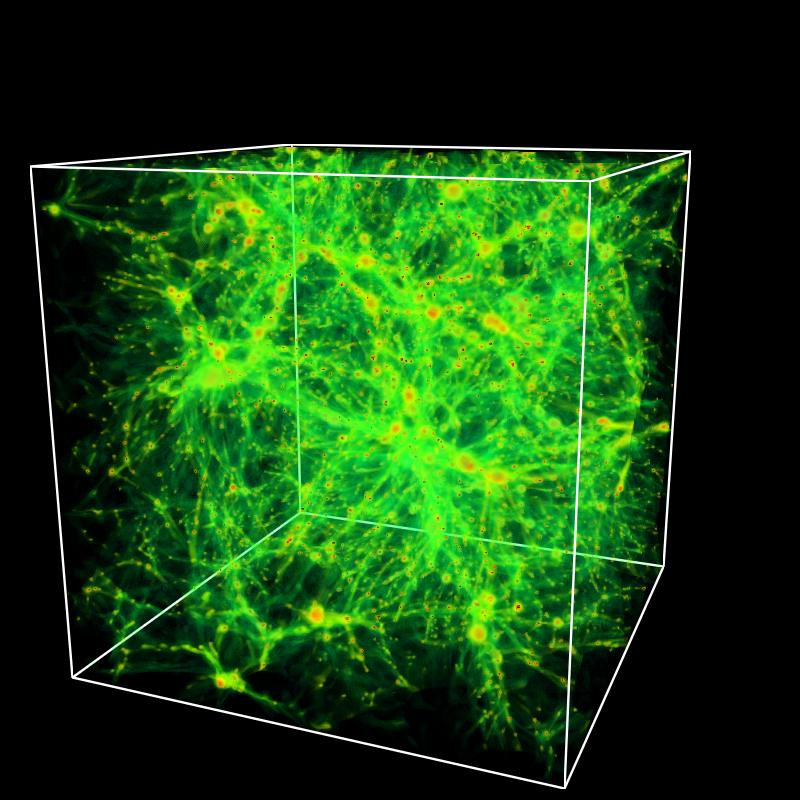
Computer simulation showing the distribution of warm-hot intergalactic plasma

The warm–hot intergalactic medium (WHIM) is the sparse, warm-to-hot (10^{5} to 10^{7} K) plasma that cosmologists believe to exist in the spaces between galaxies and to contain 40–50% of the baryonic 'normal matter' in the universe at the current epoch. The WHIM can be described as a web of hot, diffuse plasma stretching between galaxies, as well as atoms and molecules, in contrast to dark matter. The WHIM is a proposed solution to the missing baryon problem, where the observed amount of baryonic matter does not match theoretical predictions from cosmology.

Much of what is known about the warm–hot intergalactic medium comes from computer simulations of the cosmos. The WHIM is expected to form a filamentary structure of tenuous, highly ionized baryons with a number density of 1−10 particles per cubic meter. Within the WHIM, plasma shocks are created as a result of active galactic nuclei, along with the gravitationally-driven processes of merging and accretion. Part of the gravitational energy supplied by these effects is converted into thermal emissions of the matter by collisionless shock heating. The plasma shocks caused by AGNs drive plasma out of a galaxy and quench it over time.

Because of the high temperature of the medium, the expectation is that it is most easily observed from the absorption or emission of ultraviolet and low energy X-ray radiation. To locate the WHIM, researchers examined X-ray observations of a rapidly growing supermassive black hole known as an active galactic nucleus, or AGN. Oxygen atoms in the WHIM were seen to absorb X-rays passing through the medium. In May 2010, a giant reservoir of WHIM was detected by the Chandra X-ray Observatory lying along the wall-shaped structure of galaxies (Sculptor Wall) some 400 million light-years from Earth. In 2018, observations of highly-ionized extragalactic oxygen atoms appeared to confirm simulations of the WHIM mass distribution. Observations for dispersion from fast radio bursts in 2020, further appeared to confirm the missing baryonic mass to be located at the WHIM.

== Circumgalactic medium ==
Conceptually similar to WHIM, the circumgalactic medium (CGM) is a halo of plasma between the ISM and virial radii surrounding galaxies that is diffuse and nearly invisible. It serves as the boundary between galaxies and the larger intergalactic medium. Current thinking is that the CGM is an important source of star-forming material and that it regulates a galaxy’s plasma supply through plasma inflows and outflows between galaxies and the intergalactic medium.

Absorption measurements of large samples of galaxies are expected to show that plasma inflows move along the major axis of a galaxy in a corotational fashion, while plasma outflows move along the minor axis of a galaxy in a biconical fashion. Most major hydrodynamical simulations of this show that these plasma inflows and outflows stretch to around 100 kpc or above from the center of the source galaxy. This plasma recycling process affects the metallicities of the ISM of source galaxies through the mass-metallicity relation, which states that metallicity of a galaxy is positively correlated to its mass. The plasma recycling process is also known as the baryon cycle and is facilitated by the movement of the cool phase of the CGM at T ~ 10^{4} K, which is thought to be clouds of cool fluid surrounded by a hotter CGM phase at T ~ 10^{6} K. In elliptical galaxies, the hotter CGM phase is commonly considered to consist of the ejecta from Type IA supernovae and asymptotic giant branch (AGB) stars, while in disc galaxies, the hot plasma is instead thought to consist of Type II supernova ejecta carried out into the CGM by plasma outflows. At temperatures higher than 10^{6} K, nearby dust that is present in the CGM radiates away the thermal energy from collisions with the plasma. The CGM contains dust that is carried alongside plasma to the CGM through galactic outflows due to the drag force. Radiation pressure may also be partly responsible for the presence of dust in the CGM. Together these processes can demonstrate how dust leaves galaxies and enters the IGM.

If visible, the CGM of the Andromeda Galaxy (1.3-2 million ly) would stretch 3 times the size of the width of the Big Dipper –easily the biggest feature on the nighttime sky, and even bump into our own CGM, though that isn't fully known because we reside in it. There are two layered parts to Andromeda's CGM: an inner shell of plasma is nested inside an outer shell. The inner shell (0.5 million ly) is more dynamic and is thought to be more dynamic and turbulent because of outflows from supernovae, whereas the outer shell is hotter and smoother.

== See also ==
- Intergalactic space
- Intracluster medium
