= Magnetosonic wave =

Type of low-frequency compressive wave

In physics, magnetosonic waves, also known as magnetoacoustic waves, are low-frequency compressive waves driven by mutual interaction between an electrically conducting fluid and a magnetic field. They are associated with compression and rarefaction of both the fluid and the magnetic field, as well as with an effective tension that acts to straighten bent magnetic field lines. The properties of magnetosonic waves are highly dependent on the angle between the wavevector and the equilibrium magnetic field and on the relative importance of fluid and magnetic processes in the medium. They only propagate with frequencies much smaller than the ion cyclotron or ion plasma frequencies of the medium, and they are nondispersive at small amplitudes.

There are two types of magnetosonic waves, fast magnetosonic waves and slow magnetosonic waves, which—together with Alfvén waves—are the normal modes of ideal magnetohydrodynamics. The fast and slow modes are distinguished by magnetic and gas pressure oscillations that are either in-phase or anti-phase, respectively. This results in the phase velocity of any given fast mode always being greater than or equal to that of any slow mode in the same medium, among other differences.

Magnetosonic waves have been observed in the Sun's corona and provide an observational foundation for coronal seismology.

== Characteristics ==
Magnetosonic waves are a type of low-frequency wave present in electrically conducting, magnetized fluids, such as plasmas and liquid metals. They exist at frequencies far below the cyclotron and plasma frequencies of both ions and electrons in the medium (see Plasma parameters § Frequencies).

In an ideal, homogeneous, electrically conducting, magnetized fluid of infinite extent, there are two magnetosonic modes: the fast and slow modes. They form, together with the Alfvén wave, the three basic linear magnetohydrodynamic (MHD) waves. In this regime, magnetosonic waves are nondispersive at small amplitudes.

=== Dispersion relation ===
The fast and slow magnetosonic waves are defined by a bi-quadratic dispersion relation that can be derived from the linearized MHD equations.

Derivation from linearized MHD equations

In an ideal electrically conducting fluid with a homogeneous magnetic field B, the closed set of MHD equations consisting of the equation of motion, continuity equation, equation of state, and ideal induction equation (see Magnetohydrodynamics § Equations) linearized about a stationary equilibrium where the pressure p and density ρ are uniform and constant are:
$$\begin{align}
\rho_0 \frac{\partial\mathbf{v}_1}{\partial t} &= \frac{(\nabla\times\mathbf{B}_1)\times\mathbf{B}_0}{\mu_0} - \nabla p_1, \\
\frac{\partial\rho_1}{\partial t} + \rho_0\nabla\cdot\mathbf{v}_1 &= 0, \\
\frac{\partial}{\partial t}\left(\frac{p_1}{p_0} - \frac{\gamma\rho_1}{\rho_0}\right) &= 0, \\
\frac{\partial\mathbf{B}_1}{\partial t} &= \nabla\times(\mathbf{v}_1\times\mathbf{B}_0),
\end{align}$$
where equilibrium quantities have subscripts 0, perturbations have subscripts 1, γ is the adiabatic index, and μ_{0} is the vacuum permeability. Looking for a solution in the form of a superposition of plane waves which vary like exp[i(k ⋅ x − ωt)] with wavevector k and angular frequency ω, the linearized equation of motion can be re-expressed as
$$-\omega\rho_0 \mathbf{v}_1 = \frac{(\mathbf{k}\times\mathbf{B}_1)\times\mathbf{B}_0}{\mu_0} - \mathbf{k}p_1.$$
And assuming that ω ≠ 0, the remaining equations can be solved for perturbed quantities in terms of v_{1}:
$$\begin{align}
\rho_1 &= \rho_0 \frac{\mathbf{k}\cdot\mathbf{v}_1}{\omega}, \\
p_1 &= \gamma p_0 \frac{\mathbf{k}\cdot\mathbf{v}_1}{\omega}, \\
\mathbf{B}_1 &= \frac{(\mathbf{k}\cdot\mathbf{v}_1)\mathbf{B}_0 - (\mathbf{k}\cdot\mathbf{B}_0)\mathbf{v}_1}{\omega}.
\end{align}$$
Without loss of generality, we can assume that the z-axis is oriented along B_{0} and that the wavevector k lies in the xz-plane with components k_{∥} and k_{⊥} parallel and perpendicular to B_{0}, respectively. The equation of motion after substituting for the perturbed quantities reduces to the eigenvalue equation
$$\begin{pmatrix}
\omega^2 - v_A^2 k^2 - c_s^2 k_\perp^2 & 0 & -c_s^2 k_\parallel k_\perp \\
0 & \omega^2 - v_A^2 k_\parallel^2 & 0 \\
-c_s^2 k_\parallel k_\perp & 0 & \omega^2 - c_s^2 k_\parallel^2
\end{pmatrix}\begin{pmatrix} v_{x1} \\ v_{y1} \\ v_{z1} \end{pmatrix} = \mathbf{0}$$
where c_{s} = √γp_{0}/ρ_{0} is the sound speed and v_{A} = B_{0}/√μ_{0}ρ_{0} is the Alfvén speed. Setting the determinant to zero gives the dispersion relation
$$\left(\omega^2 - v_A^2 k _\parallel^2\right) \left(\omega^4 - \omega^2 k^2 c_{ms}^2 + k^2 k_\parallel^2 v_A^2 c_s^2\right) = 0$$
where
$$\textstyle c_{ms} = \sqrt{v_A^2 + c_s^2}$$
is the magnetosonic speed. This dispersion relation has three independent roots: one corresponding to the Alfvén wave and the other two corresponding to the magnetosonic modes. From the eigenvalue equation, the y-component of the velocity perturbation decouples from the other two components giving the dispersion relation ω^{2}_{A} = v^{2}_{A}k^{2}_{∥} for the Alfvén wave. The remaining bi-quadratic equation
$$\omega^4 - \omega^2 k^2 c_{ms}^2 + k^2 k_\parallel^2 v_A^2 c_s^2 = 0$$
is the dispersion relation for the fast and slow magnetosonic modes. It has roots
$$\omega^2 = \frac{k^2}{2} \left(c_{ms}^2 \pm \sqrt{c_{ms}^4 - 4 k_\parallel^2 v_A^2 c_s^2 / k^2}\right)$$
where the upper sign gives the fast magnetosonic mode and the lower sign gives the slow magnetosonic mode.

=== Phase and group velocities ===
The phase velocities of the fast and slow magnetosonic waves depend on the angle θ between the wavevector k and the equilibrium magnetic field B_{0} as well as the equilibrium density, pressure, and magnetic field strength. From the roots of the magnetosonic dispersion relation, the associated phase velocities can be expressed as
$$v_\pm^2 = \frac{\omega^2}{k^2} = \frac{1}{2} \left(c_{ms}^2 \pm \sqrt{c_{ms}^4 - 4 v_A^2 c_s^2 \cos^2\theta}\right)$$
where the upper sign gives the phase velocity v_{+} of the fast mode and the lower sign gives the phase velocity v_{−} of the slow mode.

The phase velocity of the fast mode is always greater than or equal to $\frac{c_{ms}}{\sqrt 2}$, which is greater than or equal to that of the slow mode, $v_+ \ge \frac{c_{ms}}{\sqrt 2}\ge v_-$. This is due to the differences in the signs of the thermal and magnetic pressure perturbations associated with each mode. The magnetic pressure perturbation $p_{m1} = \bold{B}_0 \sdot \bold{B}_1 / \mu_0$ can be expressed in terms of the thermal pressure perturbation p_{1} and phase velocity as
$$p_{m1} = \frac{v_A^2}{c_s^2}\left(1 - \frac{c_s^2 \cos^2 \theta}{v_\pm^2}\right)p_1.$$
For the fast mode v^{2}_{+} > c^{2}_{s} cos^{2} θ, so magnetic and thermal pressure perturbations have matching signs. Conversely, for the slow mode v^{2}_{−} < c^{2}_{s} cos^{2} θ, so magnetic and thermal pressure perturbations have opposite signs. In other words, the two pressure perturbations reinforce one another in the fast mode, but oppose one another in the slow mode. As a result, the fast mode propagates at a faster speed than the slow mode.

The group velocity v_{g ±} of fast and slow magnetosonic waves is defined by
$$\mathbf{v}_{g\pm} = \frac{d\omega}{d\mathbf{k}} = \hat{k}\, v_\pm + \hat{\theta}\frac{\partial v_\pm}{\partial\theta}$$
where and are local orthogonal unit vector in the direction of k and in the direction of increasing θ, respectively. In a spherical coordinate system with a z-axis along the unperturbed magnetic field, these unit vectors correspond to those in the direction of increasing radial distance and increasing polar angle.

=== Limiting cases ===
==== Incompressible fluid ====
In an incompressible fluid, the density and pressure perturbations vanish, ρ_{1} = 0 and p_{1} = 0, resulting in the sound speed tending to infinity, c_{s} → ∞. In this case, the slow mode propagates with the Alfvén speed, ω^{2}_{sl} = ω^{2}_{A}, and the fast mode disappears from the system, ω^{2}_{f} → ∞.

==== Cold limit ====
Under the assumption that the background temperature is zero, it follows from the ideal gas law that the thermal pressure is also zero, p_{0} = 0, and, as a result, that the sound speed vanishes, c_{s} = 0. In this case, the slow mode disappears from the system, ω^{2}_{sl} = 0, and the fast mode propagates isotropically with the Alfvén speed, ω^{2}_{f} = k^{2}v^{2}_{A}. In this limit, the fast mode is sometimes referred to as a compressional Alfvén wave.

==== Parallel propagation ====
When the wavevector and the equilibrium magnetic field are parallel, θ → 0, the fast and slow modes propagate as either a pure sound wave or pure Alfvén wave, with the fast mode identified with the larger of the two speeds and the slow mode identified with the smaller.

==== Perpendicular propagation ====
When the wavevector and the equilibrium magnetic field are perpendicular, θ → π/2, the fast mode propagates as a longitudinal wave with phase velocity equal to the magnetosonic speed, and the slow mode propagates as a transverse wave with phase velocity approaching zero.

== Inhomogeneous fluid ==
In the case of an inhomogeneous fluids (that is, a fluid where at least one of the background quantities is not constant) the MHD waves lose their defining nature and get mixed properties. In some setups, such as the axisymmetric waves in a straight cylinder with a circular basis (one of the simplest models for a coronal loop), the three MHD waves can still be clearly distinguished. But in general, the pure Alfvén and fast and slow magnetosonic waves don't exist, and the waves in the fluid are coupled to each other in intricate ways.

== Observations ==
Both fast and slow magnetosonic waves have been observed in the solar corona providing an observational foundation for the technique for coronal plasma diagnostics, coronal seismology.

== See also ==
- Waves in plasmas
- Alfvén wave
- Ion acoustic wave
- Coronal seismology
- Magnetogravity wave
