= DO Draconis/YY Draconis =

Binary star in the constellation of Draco

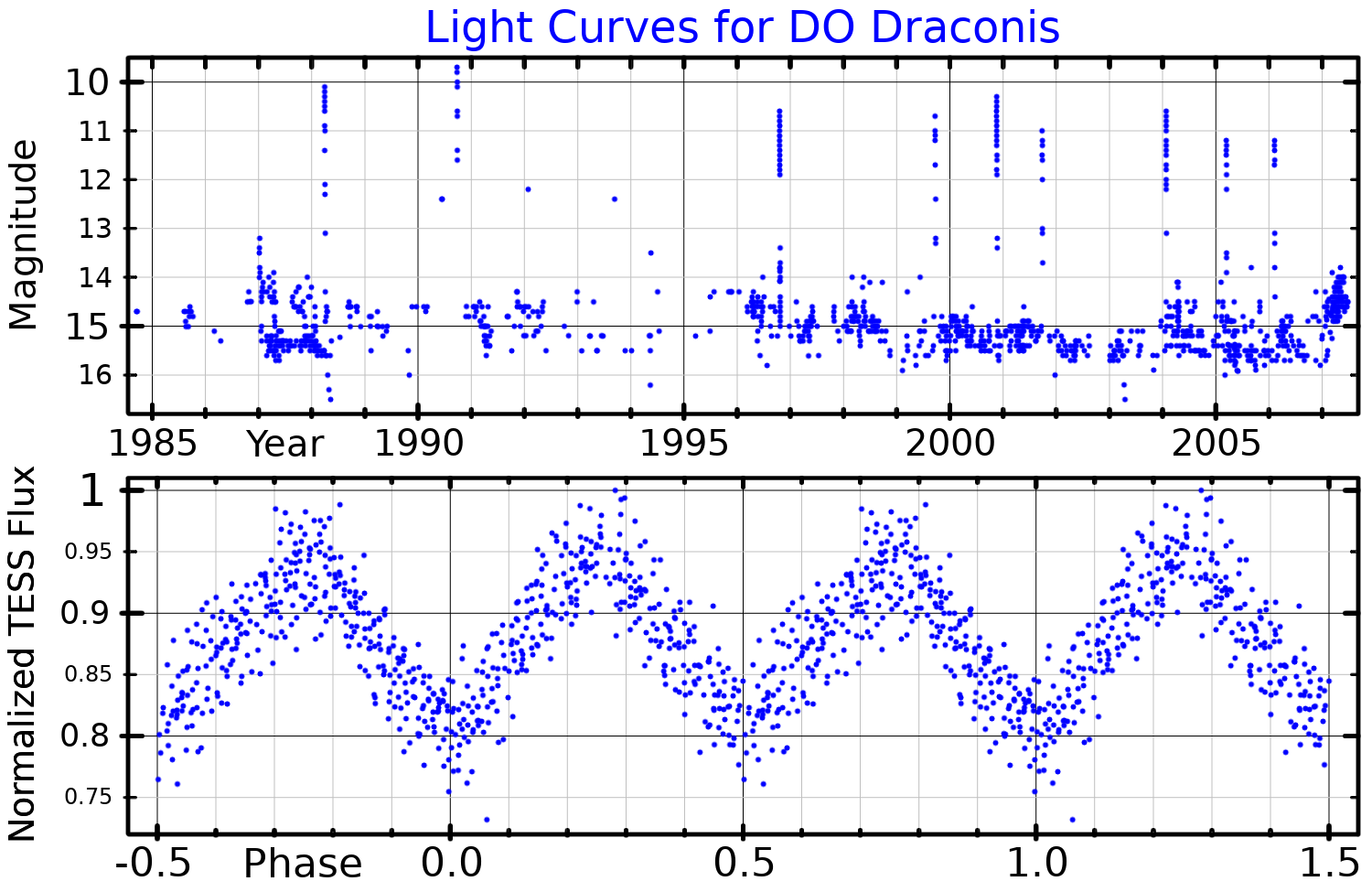
- Light curves for DO Draconis. The upper plot, adapted from Andronov et al., shows the long-term variability and eruptive behaviour. The lower plot, adapted from Hill et al., shows the ellipsoidal variability assuming a period of 3.96898 hours.

Observation data Epoch J2000.0 Equinox ICRS
- Constellation: Draco
- Right ascension: 11^{h} 43^{m} 38.492^{s}
- Declination: +71° 41′ 20.56″
- Apparent magnitude (V): 10.0 to 15.1

Characteristics
- Spectral type: M2V (M0.5-M3.5V)
- Variable type: U Gem

Astrometry
Proper motion (μ)	RA: 14.379 mas/yr Dec.: 12.772 mas/yr
Parallax (π)	5.1049±0.0278 mas
Distance	636.0 ± 3.3 ly (195±1 pc)

Orbit
Period (P)	3.968982 h
Semi-major axis (a)	1.35±0.15 R_{☉}
Inclination (i)	42+2 −1°
Semi-amplitude (K_{1}) (primary)	87±13 km/s
Semi-amplitude (K_{2}) (secondary)	188+1 −2 km/s

Details

Accreting white dwarf
Mass	0.99+0.10 −0.09 M_{☉}
Temperature	21,500 K
Rotation	529.31±0.02 s
Rotational velocity (v sin i)	103±2 km/s

Donor red dwarf
Mass	0.62+0.07 −0.06 M_{☉}
Radius	0.64±0.08 R_{☉}
Surface gravity (log g)	4.83±0.06 cgs
Temperature	3,413+134 −150 K
Rotational velocity (v sin i)	86±15 km/s

Other designations
- DO Dra or YY Dra, 3A 1148+719, PG 1140+719, AAVSO 1137+72

Database references
SIMBAD	data

YY Draconis and DO Draconis are separate identifiers for what is likely the same cataclysmic variable system in the northern constellation of Draco, abbreviated YY Dra and DO Dra, respectively. The DO Dra binary star system is classified as a U Geminorum variable that ranges in luminosity from an apparent visual magnitude of 10.0 down to 15.1. It is located at a distance of approximately 640 light-years.

== Identification ==
The variable YY Draconis was identified by W. Tsesevich in 1934 and determined to be an Algol type binary that ranged in brightness from apparent magnitude 12.9 to under 14.5 with a period of 4.21123 days. However, subsequent scans of photographic plates at the same coordinates have failed to identify any such variation. Hence, a positional reporting error is suspected, and no further observations of this variable were reported (as of 1983).

In 1982, the X-ray emission source PG 1148+719 (3A 1148+719) was associated with a star displaying the spectrum of a U Geminorum variable by R. F. Green and associates. In their paper, they identified this star as YY Dra, based on a positional search of the General Catalogue of Variable Stars. The following year, W. Wenzel found the association with YY Dra appeared erroneous but discovered a nearby eruptive variable that brightened to magnitude 10.6 then dimmed to below magnitude 14.5. He estimated a lengthy cycle time of 5 to 20 years, comparable to BZ Ursae Majoris. This cataclysmic variable was cataloged as DO Draconis.

An outburst of DO Dra was observed while in progress in 1985, which brought the system to about a magnitude brighter than minimum. In 1987, a debate arose as to whether this is the same variable as YY Dra, as the coordinates are separated by only 53″. Discussion of this identity conflict has continued as recently as 2022, and, historically, both identifiers have been used to discuss the same cataclysmic variable. A full resolution of this conflict may prove impossible since many of the original photographic plates were destroyed during World War II. The continued use of DO Dra for this variable has been encouraged since it is an unambiguous identifier.

== Properties ==
In 1991, M. Mateo and associates found an orbital period of 3.96 h with a semimajor axis of 1.35±0.15 R_{☉} for this binary system. DO Dra consists of a compact white dwarf primary being orbited by a red dwarf stellar companion. The red dwarf has filled its Roche lobe and is losing mass, which is being accreted by the white dwarf. Because of the close orbit, the red dwarf is rotating rapidly and is expected to be magnetically active. However, the majority of the ionized calcium emission lines originate from irradiation of the red dwarf by soft X-rays coming from the primary.

This system was identified as a DQ Herculis variable by J. Patterson and associates in 1994 – also known as an intermediate polar. This indicates the white dwarf has a sufficiently strong magnetic field to channel the flow of gas from an orbiting accretion disk onto its magnetic poles. The shock from this accretion is producing the X-ray flux. A 1997 study based on observations with the Hubble Space Telescope found a rotation period of 529.31±0.02 s for the white dwarf.

Analysis of the ASCA archival data of YY Dra showed periodicities at 264.9±0.9 s and 529.3±3.5 s in the X-ray power spectrum and the modulation depth of the pulse profiles increases with increasing energy. The same study, also concluded that the X-ray spectrum of YY Dra can be represented by a single or two-temperature model of VMEKAL/MEKAL or thermal bremsstrahlung.

This spin rate is producing coherent pulsations that are detectable in both the visual and X-ray spectrum. The magnetic poles reach effective temperatures of 220,000 K in the accretion region, compared to 21,500 K for the remainder of the white dwarf surface.
