= Waves in plasmas =

Concept in physics

In plasma physics, waves in plasmas are an interconnected set of particles and fields which propagate in a periodically repeating fashion. A plasma is a quasineutral, electrically conductive fluid. In the simplest case, it is composed of electrons and a single species of positive ions, but it may also contain multiple ion species including negative ions as well as neutral particles. Due to its electrical conductivity, a plasma couples to electric and magnetic fields. This complex of particles and fields supports a wide variety of wave phenomena.

The electromagnetic fields in a plasma are assumed to have two parts, one static/equilibrium part and one oscillating/perturbation part. Waves in plasmas can be classified as electromagnetic or electrostatic according to whether or not there is an oscillating magnetic field. Applying Faraday's law of induction to plane waves, we find $\mathbf{k} \times \tilde{\mathbf{E}} = \omega \tilde{\mathbf{B}}$, implying that an electrostatic wave must be purely longitudinal. An electromagnetic wave, in contrast, must have a transverse component, but may also be partially longitudinal.

Waves can be further classified by the oscillating species. In most plasmas of interest, the electron temperature is comparable to or larger than the ion temperature. This fact, coupled with the much smaller mass of the electron, implies that the electrons move much faster than the ions. An electron mode depends on the mass of the electrons, but the ions may be assumed to be infinitely massive, i.e. stationary. An ion mode depends on the ion mass, but the electrons are assumed to be massless and to redistribute themselves instantaneously according to the Boltzmann relation. Only rarely, e.g. in the lower hybrid oscillation, will a mode depend on both the electron and the ion mass.

The various modes can also be classified according to whether they propagate in an unmagnetized plasma or parallel, perpendicular, or oblique to the stationary magnetic field. Finally, for perpendicular electromagnetic electron waves, the perturbed electric field can be parallel or perpendicular to the stationary magnetic field.

Summary of elementary plasma waves
| EM character | oscillating species | conditions | dispersion relation | name |
|---|---|---|---|---|
| electrostatic | electrons | $\mathbf B_0=0$ or $\mathbf k \parallel \mathbf B_0$ | $\omega^2 = \omega_p^2 + 3 k^2 v_\text{th}^2$ | plasma oscillation (or Langmuir wave) |
| electrostatic | electrons | $\mathbf k\perp\mathbf B_0$ | $\omega^2=\omega_p^2 + \omega_c^2=\omega_h^2$ | upper hybrid oscillation |
| electrostatic | ions | $\mathbf B_0=0$ or $\mathbf k \parallel \mathbf B_0$ | $\omega^2 = k^2 v_s^2 = k^2 \frac{\gamma_e k_\text{B} T_e + \gamma_i k_\text{B} T_i}{M}$ | ion acoustic wave |
| electrostatic | ions | $\mathbf k\perp\mathbf B_0$ (nearly) | $\omega^2=\Omega_c^2 + k^2v_s^2$ | electrostatic ion cyclotron wave |
| electrostatic | ions | $\mathbf k\perp\mathbf B_0$ (exactly) | $\omega^2 = {\left[{\left(\Omega_c \omega_c\right)}^{-1} + \omega_i^{-2}\right]}^{-1}$ | lower hybrid oscillation |
| electromagnetic | electrons | $\mathbf B_0 = 0$ | $\omega^2 = \omega_p^2 + k^2c^2$ | light wave |
| electromagnetic | electrons | $\mathbf k\perp\mathbf B_0$, $\mathbf E_1 \parallel \mathbf B_0$ | $\frac{c^2k^2}{\omega^2} = 1 - \frac{\omega_p^2}{\omega^2}$ | O wave |
| electromagnetic | electrons | $\mathbf k\perp\mathbf B_0$, $\mathbf E_1\perp\mathbf B_0$ | $\frac{c^2k^2}{\omega^2} = 1 - \frac{\omega_p^2}{\omega^2}\, \frac{\omega^2 - \omega_p^2}{\omega^2-\omega_h^2}$ | X wave |
| electromagnetic | electrons | $\mathbf k \parallel \mathbf B_0$ (right circ. pol.) | $\frac{c^2k^2}{\omega^2}=1-\frac{\omega_p^2/\omega^2}{1-(\omega_c/\omega)}$ | R wave (whistler mode) |
| electromagnetic | electrons | $\mathbf k \parallel \mathbf B_0$ (left circ. pol.) | $\frac{c^2k^2}{\omega^2}=1-\frac{\omega_p^2/\omega^2}{1 + (\omega_c/\omega)}$ | L wave |
| electromagnetic | ions | $\mathbf B_0=0$ | | none |
| electromagnetic | ions | $\mathbf k \parallel \mathbf B_0$ | $\omega^2 = k^2 v_A^2$ | Alfvén wave |
| electromagnetic | ions | $\mathbf k\perp\mathbf B_0$ | $\frac{\omega^2}{k^2} = c^2\, \frac{v_s^2 + v_A^2}{c^2 + v_A^2}$ | magnetosonic wave |

- $\omega$ - wave frequency,
- $k$ - wave number,
- $c$ - speed of light,
- $\omega_p$ - plasma frequency,
- $\omega_i$ - ion plasma frequency,
- $\omega_c$ - electron gyrofrequency,
- $\Omega_c$ - ion gyrofrequency,
- $\omega_h$ - upper hybrid frequency,
- $v_s$ - plasma "sound" speed,
- $v_A$ - plasma Alfvén speed

(The subscript 0 denotes the static part of the electric or magnetic field, and the subscript 1 denotes the oscillating part.)

== See also ==
- Magnetohydrodynamic waves
- Appleton–Hartree equation
- Plasmon
- Surface plasmon resonance
- Electron wake
- Index of wave articles
- Waves (Juno) (spacecraft instrument aboard Jupiter orbiter)
- Plasma Wave Subsystem (Instrument on Voyager probes)

== Bibliography ==
- Swanson, D.G. Plasma Waves (2003). 2nd edition.
- Stix, Thomas Howard. Waves in Plasmas (1992).
- Chen, Francis F. Introduction to Plasma Physics and Controlled Fusion, 2nd edition (1984).
