= Ion acoustic wave =

Type of wave in plasma

In plasma physics, an ion acoustic wave is one type of longitudinal oscillation of the ions and electrons in a plasma, much like acoustic waves traveling in neutral gas. However, because the waves propagate through positively charged ions, ion acoustic waves can interact with their electromagnetic fields, as well as simple collisions. In plasmas, ion acoustic waves are frequently referred to as acoustic waves or even just sound waves. They commonly govern the evolution of mass density, for instance due to pressure gradients, on time scales longer than the frequency corresponding to the relevant length scale. Ion acoustic waves can occur in an unmagnetized plasma or in a magnetized plasma parallel to the magnetic field. For a single ion species plasma and in the long wavelength limit, the waves are dispersionless ($\omega=v_sk$) with a speed given by (see derivation below)

$$v_s = \sqrt{\frac{\gamma_{e}Zk_\text{B}T_e+\gamma_{i}k_\text{B}T_i}{M}}$$

where $k_\text{B}$ is the Boltzmann constant, $M$ is the mass of the ion, $Z$ is its charge, $T_e$ is the temperature of the electrons and $T_i$ is the temperature of the ions. Normally γ_{e} is taken to be unity, on the grounds that the thermal conductivity of electrons is large enough to keep them isothermal on the time scale of ion acoustic waves, and γ_{i} is taken to be 3, corresponding to one-dimensional motion. In collisionless plasmas, the electrons are often much hotter than the ions, in which case the second term in the numerator can be ignored.

== Derivation ==
We derive the ion acoustic wave dispersion relation for a linearized fluid description of a plasma with electrons and $N$ ion species. We write each quantity as $X=X_0+\delta\cdot X_1$where subscript 0 denotes the "zero-order" constant equilibrium value, and 1 denotes the first-order perturbation. $\delta$ is an ordering parameter for linearization, and has the physical value 1. To linearize, we balance all terms in each equation of the same order in $\delta$. The terms involving only subscript-0 quantities are all order $\delta^0$and must balance, and terms with one subscript-1 quantity are all order $\delta^1$and balance. We treat the electric field as order-1 ($\vec E_0=0$) and neglect magnetic fields.

Each species $s$ is described by mass $m_s$, charge $q_s=Z_se$, number density $n_s$, flow velocity $\vec u_s$, and pressure $p_s$. We assume the pressure perturbations for each species are a Polytropic process, namely $p_{s1} = \gamma_s T_{s0} n_{s1}$ for species $s$. To justify this assumption and determine the value of $\gamma_s$, one must use a kinetic treatment that solves for the species distribution functions in velocity space. The polytropic assumption essentially replaces the energy equation.

Each species satisfies the continuity equation
$$\partial_t n_s + \nabla\cdot(n_s\vec u_s) = 0$$
and the momentum equation

$\partial_t \vec u_s + \vec u_s \cdot\nabla\vec u_s = {Z_s e \over m_s}\vec E - {\nabla p_s \over n_s}$.

We now linearize, and work with order-1 equations. Since we do not work with $T_{s1}$due to the polytropic assumption (but we do not assume it is zero), to alleviate notation we use $T_s$for $T_{s0}$. Using the ion continuity equation, the ion momentum equation becomes

$$(-m_i\partial_{tt}+\gamma_iT_{i}\nabla^2)n_{i1} = Z_ien_{i0}\nabla\cdot\vec E_1$$

We relate the electric field $\vec E_1$ to the electron density by the electron momentum equation:

$$n_{e0}m_e\partial_t\vec v_{e1} = -n_{e0}e\vec E_1 - \gamma_eT_{e}\nabla n_{e1}$$

We now neglect the left-hand side, which is due to electron inertia. This is valid for waves with frequencies much less than the electron plasma frequency $(n_{e0}e^2/\epsilon_0m_e)^{1/2}$. This is a good approximation for $m_i\gg m_e$, such as ionized matter, but not for situations like electron-hole plasmas in semiconductors, or electron-positron plasmas. The resulting electric field is

$$\vec E_1  = - {\gamma_eT_{e} \over n_{e0}e}\nabla n_{e1}$$

Since we have already solved for the electric field, we cannot also find it from Poisson's equation. The ion momentum equation now relates $n_{i1}$ for each species to $n_{e1}$:

$$(-m_i\partial_{tt}+\gamma_iT_{i}\nabla^2)n_{i1} = -\gamma_e T_{e} \nabla^2 n_{e1}$$

We arrive at a dispersion relation via Poisson's equation:

$${\epsilon_0 \over e}\nabla\cdot\vec E_1 = \left[ \sum_{i=1}^N n_{i0}Z_i - n_{e0} \right] + \left[ \sum_{i=1}^N n_{i1}Z_i - n_{e1} \right]$$

The first bracketed term on the right is zero by assumption (charge-neutral equilibrium). We substitute for the electric field and rearrange to find

$$(1-\gamma_e \lambda_{De}^2\nabla^2)n_{e1} = \sum_{i=1}^N Z_in_{i1}$$.

$\lambda_{De}^2 \equiv \epsilon_0T_{e}/(n_{e0}e^2)$ defines the electron Debye length. The second term on the left arises from the $\nabla\cdot\vec E$ term, and reflects the degree to which the perturbation is not charge-neutral. If $k\lambda_{De}$ is small we may drop this term. This approximation is sometimes called the plasma approximation.

We now work in Fourier space, and write each order-1 field as $X_1 = \tilde X_1 \exp i(\vec k\cdot\vec x-\omega t) + c.c.$ We drop the tilde since all equations now apply to the Fourier amplitudes, and find

$$n_{i1} = \gamma_eT_{e}Z_i {n_{i0} \over n_{e0}} [m_iv_s^2-\gamma_iT_{i}]^{-1} n_{e1}$$

$v_s=\omega/k$ is the wave phase velocity. Substituting this into Poisson's equation gives us an expression where each term is proportional to $n_{e1}$. To find the dispersion relation for natural modes, we look for solutions for $n_{e1}$ nonzero and find:

$\gamma_eT_e \left\langle { Z_i^2 \over m_i v_s^2 - \gamma_iT_i } \right\rangle = \langle Z_i \rangle (1+\gamma_e k^2\lambda_{De}^2)$.	dispgen

$n_{i1}=f_in_{I1}$ where $n_{I1}=\Sigma_i n_{i1}$, so the ion fractions satisfy $\Sigma_if_i=1$, and $\langle X_i \rangle \equiv \Sigma_i f_iX_i$ is the average over ion species. A unitless version of this equation is

$${\gamma_e \over \langle Z_i \rangle} \left\langle {Z_i^2/A_i \over u^2 - \tau_i} \right\rangle = 1+\gamma_e k^2\lambda_{De}^2$$

with $A_i=m_i/m_u$, $m_u$ is the atomic mass unit, $u^2=m_uv_s^2/T_e$, and

$$\tau_i = {\gamma_i T_i \over A_i T_e}$$

If $k\lambda_{De}$ is small (the plasma approximation), we can neglect the second term on the right-hand side, and the wave is dispersionless $\omega = v_sk$ with $v_s$ independent of k.

== Dispersion relation ==
The general dispersion relation given above for ion acoustic waves can be put in the form of an order-N polynomial (for N ion species) in $u^2$. All of the roots should be real-positive, since we have neglected damping. The two signs of $u$ correspond to right- and left-moving waves. For a single ion species,

$$v_s^2 = {\gamma_eZ_iT_e \over m_i}{1 \over 1+\gamma_e(k\lambda_{De})^2} + {\gamma_iT_{i}\over m_i}
= {\gamma_eZ_iT_e \over m_i} \left[ {1 \over 1+\gamma_e(k\lambda_{De})^2} + {\gamma_iT_{i}\over Z_i\gamma_eT_e} \right]$$

We now consider multiple ion species, for the common case $T_i \ll T_e$. For $T_i=0$, the dispersion relation has N-1 degenerate roots $u^2=0$, and one non-zero root

$$v_s^2(T_i=0) \equiv {\gamma_eT_e/m_u \over 1+\gamma_e(k\lambda_{De})^2} { \langle Z_i^2/A_i\rangle \over \langle Z_i \rangle }$$

This non-zero root is called the "fast mode", since $v_s$ is typically greater than all the ion thermal speeds. The approximate fast-mode solution for $T_i\ll T_e$ is

$$v_s^2 \approx v_s^2(T_i=0)
+ { \langle Z_i^2 \gamma_i T_i / A_i^2 \rangle \over m_u\langle Z_i^2 / A_i \rangle }$$

The N-1 roots that are zero for $T_i=0$ are called "slow modes", since $v_s$ can be comparable to or less than the thermal speed of one or more of the ion species.

A case of interest to nuclear fusion is an equimolar mixture of deuterium and tritium ions ($f_D=f_T=1/2$). Let us specialize to full ionization ($Z_D=Z_T=1$), equal temperatures ($T_e=T_i$), polytrope exponents $\gamma_e=1, \gamma_i=3$, and neglect the $(k\lambda_{De})^2$ contribution. The dispersion relation becomes a quadratic in $v_s^2$, namely:

$$2A_DA_Tu^4 - 7(A_D+A_T)u^2 + 24=0$$

Using $(A_D,A_T)=(2.01,3.02)$ we find the two roots are $u^2=(1.10,1.81)$.

Another case of interest is one with two ion species of very different masses. An example is a mixture of gold (A=197) and boron (A=10.8), which is currently of interest in hohlraums for laser-driven inertial fusion research. For a concrete example, consider $\gamma_e=1$ and $\gamma_i=3, T_i=T_e/2$ for both ion species, and charge states Z=5 for boron and Z=50 for gold. We leave the boron atomic fraction $f_B$ unspecified (note $f_{Au}=1-f_B$). Thus, $\bar Z=50-45 f_B, \tau_B=0.139, \tau_{Au}=0.00761, F_B=2.31 f_B/\bar Z,$ and $F_{Au}=12.69(1-f_B)/\bar Z$.

== Damping ==
Ion acoustic waves are damped both by Coulomb collisions and collisionless Landau damping. The Landau damping occurs on both electrons and ions, with the relative importance depending on parameters.

== See also ==
- Waves in plasmas
- Sound
- Alfvén wave
- Magnetosonic wave
