= Electromagnetic electron wave =

In plasma physics, an electromagnetic electron wave is a wave in a plasma which has a magnetic field component and in which primarily the electrons oscillate.

In an unmagnetized plasma, an electromagnetic electron wave is simply a light wave modified by the plasma. In a magnetized plasma, there are two modes perpendicular to the field, the O and X modes, and two modes parallel to the field, the R and L waves.

== Waves in an unmagnetized plasma ==
=== Langmuir wave ===
The Langmuir wave is a purely longitudinal wave, that is, the wave vector is in the same direction as the electric field. It is an electrostatic wave; as such, it doesn't have an oscillating magnetic field.

A plasma consists of charged particles which react to electric fields, in contrast with dielectric matter. When electrons in a uniform, homogeneous plasma are perturbed from their equilibrium position, a charge separation occurs creating an electric field which acts as restoring force on the electrons. Since electrons have inertia the system behaves as a harmonic oscillator, where the electrons oscillate at a frequency ω_{pe}, called electron plasma frequency. These oscillations do not propagate—the group velocity is 0.

When the thermal motion of the electrons is taken into account a shift in frequency from the electron plasma frequency ω_{pe} occurs. Now the electron pressure gradient acts as the restoring force, creating a propagating wave analogous to a sound wave in non-ionized gases. Combining these two restoring forces (from the electric field and electron pressure gradient) a type of wave, named Langmuir wave, is excited. The dispersion relation is:

$\omega^2 = \omega_{\rm pe}^2 + 3 C_{\mathrm e}^2 k^2$

The first term on the right-hand side of the dispersion relation is the electron plasma oscillation related to the electric field force and the second term is related to the thermal motion of the electrons, where C_{e} is the electron thermal speed and k is the wave vector.

=== Electromagnetic wave ===
In an unmagnetized plasma, waves above the plasma frequency propagate through the plasma according to the dispersion relation:

$1 - \frac{\omega_{pe}^2}{\omega^2} - \frac{k^2 c^2}{\omega^2} = 0 \rightarrow \omega^2 = c^2 k^2 + \omega_{pe}^2$

In an unmagnetized plasma for the high frequency or low electron density limit, i.e. for $\omega \gg \omega_{\rm pe}=(n_{\mathrm e}e^2/m_{\mathrm e}\epsilon_0)^{1/2}$ or $n_{\mathrm e} \ll m_{\mathrm e}\omega^2\epsilon_0\,/\,e^2$ where ω_{pe} is the plasma frequency, the wave speed is the speed of light in vacuum. As the electron density increases, the phase velocity increases and the group velocity decreases until the cut-off frequency where the light frequency is equal to ω_{pe}. This density is known as the critical density for the angular frequency ω of that wave and is given by

$n_{\mathrm c} = \frac{\varepsilon_0\,m_{\mathrm e}}{e^2}\,\omega^2$ (SI units)

If the critical density is exceeded, the plasma is called over-dense.

In a magnetized plasma, except for the O wave, the cut-off relationships are more complex.

== Modes ==
=== O wave ===
The O wave is the "ordinary" wave in the sense that its dispersion relation is the same as that in an unmagnetized plasma,
$$1 - \frac{\omega_{\rm pe}^2}{\omega^2} - \frac{k^2 c^2}{\omega^2} = 0 \rightarrow \omega^2 = c^2 k^2 + \omega_{\rm pe}^2.$$
It is plane polarized with E_{1} || B_{0}. It has a cut-off at the plasma frequency.

=== X wave ===
The X wave is the "extraordinary" wave because it has a more complicated dispersion relation:

$$n^2 = \frac{[(\omega+\omega_{\rm ci})(\omega-\omega_{\rm ce})-\omega_{\mathrm p}^2][(\omega-\omega_{\rm ci})(\omega+\omega_{\rm ce})-\omega_{\mathrm p}^2]}{(\omega^2-\omega_{\rm ci}^2)(\omega^2-\omega_{\rm ce}^2)+\omega_p^2(\omega_{\rm ce}\omega_{\rm ci}-\omega^2)},$$

where $\omega_{\mathrm p}^2 = \omega_{\rm pe}^2+\omega_{\rm pi}^2$.

It is partly transverse (with E_{1}⊥B_{0}) and partly longitudinal; the E-field is of the form

$$\left(E_x, -j\frac{S}{D}E_x, 0\right)$$
where $S,D$ refer to the Stix notation (named after Thomas H. Stix).

As the density is increased, the phase velocity rises from c until the cut-off at $\omega_{\mathrm R}$ is reached. As the density is further increased, the wave is evanescent until the resonance at the upper hybrid frequency $\omega_{\mathrm h}^2 = \omega_{\mathrm p}^2 + \omega_{\mathrm c}^2$. Then it can propagate again until the second cut-off at $\omega_{\mathrm L}$. The cut-off frequencies are given by
$$\begin{align}
\omega_{\mathrm R} &= \frac{1}{2}\left[  \omega_{\mathrm c} + \left(\omega_{\mathrm c}^2 + 4\omega_{\mathrm p}^2\right)^\frac{1}{2} \right] \\
\omega_{\mathrm L} &= \frac{1}{2}\left[ -\omega_{\mathrm c} + \left(\omega_{\mathrm c}^2 + 4\omega_{\mathrm p}^2\right)^\frac{1}{2} \right]
\end{align}$$
where $\omega_{\mathrm c}$ is the electron cyclotron resonance frequency, and $\omega_{\mathrm p}$ is the electron plasma frequency.

The resonant frequencies for the X-wave are given by

$$\omega^2 = \frac{\omega_{\mathrm e}^2+\omega_{\mathrm i}^2}{2} \pm \sqrt{\left(\frac{\omega_{\mathrm e}^2-\omega_{\mathrm i}^2}{2}\right)^2+\omega_{\rm pe}^2\omega_{\rm pi}^2}\,,$$

where $\omega_a^2 = \omega_{\mathrm pa}^2+\omega_{\mathrm ca}^2$ and $a = \mathrm e, \mathrm i$.

=== R wave and L wave ===
The R wave and the L wave are right-hand and left-hand circularly polarized, respectively. The R wave has a cut-off at ω_{R} (hence the designation of this frequency) and a resonance at ω_{c}. The L wave has a cut-off at ω_{L} and no resonance. R waves at frequencies below ω_{c}/2 are also known as whistler modes.

== Dispersion relations ==
The dispersion relation can be written as an expression for the frequency (squared), but it is also common to write it as an expression for the index of refraction ck/ω (squared).

Summary of electromagnetic electron waves
Conditions	Dispersion relation	Name
$\vec B_0 = 0$	$\omega^2 = \omega_p^2 + k^2c^2$	Light wave
$\vec k\perp\vec B_0,\ \vec E_1\|\vec B_0$	$\frac{c^2k^2}{\omega^2} = 1 - \frac{\omega_p^2}{\omega^2}$	O wave
$\vec k\perp\vec B_0,\ \vec E_1\perp\vec B_0$	$\frac{c^2k^2}{\omega^2} = 1 - \frac{\omega_p^2}{\omega^2}\, \frac{\omega^2 - \omega_p^2}{\omega^2 - \omega_h^2}$	X wave
$\vec k\|\vec B_0$ (right circ. pol.)	$\frac{c^2k^2}{\omega^2} = 1 - \frac{\omega_p^2/\omega^2}{1 - \omega_c/\omega}$	R wave (whistler mode)
$\vec k\|\vec B_0$ (left circ. pol.)	$\frac{c^2k^2}{\omega^2} = 1 - \frac{\omega_p^2/\omega^2}{1 + \omega_c/\omega}$	L wave

== See also ==
- Appleton–Hartree equation
