= Critical density =

Critical density may refer to:

- Critical density (cosmology), the matter density of a spatially flat Universe
- Critical density (thermodynamics), the density of a substance at its thermodynamic critical point
- Critical plasma density, the density at which the plasma frequency equals the frequency of an electromagnetic electron wave in plasma
