= Lower hybrid oscillation =

Longitudinal oscillation of ions and electrons in a magnetized plasma

In plasma physics, a lower hybrid oscillation is a longitudinal oscillation of ions and electrons in a magnetized plasma. The direction of propagation must be very nearly perpendicular to the stationary magnetic field, within about √m_{e}/m_{i} radians. Otherwise the electrons can move along the field lines fast enough to shield the oscillations in potential. The frequency of oscillation is

$$\omega = [(\Omega_i\Omega_e)^{-1}+\omega_{pi}^{-2}]^{-1/2}$$,

where Ω_{i} is the ion cyclotron frequency, Ω_{e} is the electron cyclotron frequency and ω_{pi} is the ion plasma frequency. This is the lower hybrid frequency, so called because it is a "hybrid", or mixture, of two frequencies. There are also an upper hybrid frequency and upper hybrid oscillation.

The lower hybrid oscillation is unusual in that the ion and electron masses play an equally important role. This mode is relatively unimportant in practice because the necessary precise orientation relative to the magnetic field is seldom achieved. Exceptions are the use of lower hybrid waves to heat and drive current in fusion plasmas, and the lower hybrid drift instability, which was thought to be an important determinant of transport in the Field-Reversed Configuration (but was not found experimentally).

== See also ==
- Electrostatic ion cyclotron wave
- Waves in plasmas
- Ion acoustic wave
- Upper hybrid oscillation
