= Coronal seismology =

Technique of studying the Sun's corona

Coronal seismology is a technique of studying the plasma of the Sun's corona with the use of magnetohydrodynamic (MHD) waves and oscillations. Magnetohydrodynamics studies the dynamics of electrically conducting fluids - in this case the fluid is the coronal plasma. Observed properties of the waves (e.g. period, wavelength, amplitude, temporal and spatial signatures (what is the shape of the wave perturbation?), characteristic scenarios of the wave evolution (is the wave damped?), combined with a theoretical modelling of the wave phenomena (dispersion relations, evolutionary equations, etc.), may reflect physical parameters of the corona which are not accessible in situ, such as the coronal magnetic field strength and Alfvén velocity and coronal dissipative coefficients. Originally, the method of MHD coronal seismology was suggested by Y. Uchida in 1970 for propagating waves, and B. Roberts et al. in 1984 for standing waves, but was not practically applied until the late 90s due to a lack of necessary observational resolution. Philosophically, coronal seismology is similar to the Earth's seismology, helioseismology, and MHD spectroscopy of laboratory plasma devices. In all these approaches, waves of various kind are used to probe a medium.

The theoretical foundation of coronal seismology is the dispersion relation of MHD modes of a plasma cylinder: a plasma structure which is nonuniform in the transverse direction and extended along the magnetic field. This model works well for the description of a number of plasma structures observed in the solar corona: e.g. coronal loops, prominence fibrils, plumes, various filaments. Such a structure acts as a waveguide of MHD waves.

This discussion is adapted from Nakariakov & Verwichte (2009).

== Modes ==
There are several distinct kinds of MHD modes which have quite different dispersive, polarisation, and propagation properties.

=== Kink modes ===
Kink (or transverse) modes, which are oblique fast magnetoacoustic (also known as magnetosonic waves) guided by the plasma structure; the mode causes the displacement of the axis of the plasma structure. These modes are weakly compressible, but could nevertheless be observed with imaging instruments as periodic standing or propagating displacements of coronal structures, e.g. coronal loops. The frequency of transverse or "kink" modes is given by the following expression:

$$\omega_{K}=\sqrt{\frac{2k_{z}B^{2}}{\mu(\rho_{i}+\rho_{e})}}$$

For kink modes the parameter the azimuthal wave number in a cylindrical model of a loop, $m$ is equal to 1, meaning that the cylinder is swaying with fixed ends.

=== Sausage modes ===
Sausage modes, which are also oblique fast magnetoacoustic waves guided by the plasma structure; the mode causes expansions and contractions of the plasma structure, but does not displace its axis. These modes are compressible and cause significant variation of the absolute value of the magnetic field in the oscillating structure. The frequency of sausage modes is given by the following expression:

$$\omega_{S}=\sqrt{\frac{k_{z}^{2}B^{2}}{\mu\rho_{e}}}$$

For sausage modes the parameter $m$ is equal to 0; this would be interpreted as a "breathing" in and out, again with fixed endpoints.

=== Longitudinal modes ===
Longitudinal (or slow, or acoustic) modes, which are slow magnetoacoustic waves propagating mainly along the magnetic field in the plasma structure; these mode are essentially compressible. The magnetic field perturbation in these modes is negligible. The frequency of slow modes is given by the following expression:

$$\omega_{L}=\sqrt{k^{2}_{z}\left ( \frac{C_{s}^{2}C_{A}^{2}}{C_{s}^{2}+C_{A}^{2}} \right )}$$

Where we define $C_{s}$ as the sound speed and $C_{A}$ as the Alfvén velocity.

=== Torsional modes ===
Torsional (Alfvén or twist) modes are incompressible transverse perturbations of the magnetic field along certain individual magnetic surfaces. In contrast with kink modes, torsional modes cannot be observed with imaging instruments, as they do not cause the displacement of either the structure axis or its boundary.

$$\omega_{A}=\sqrt{\frac{k_{z}^{2}B^{2}}{\mu\rho_{i}}}$$

== Observations ==
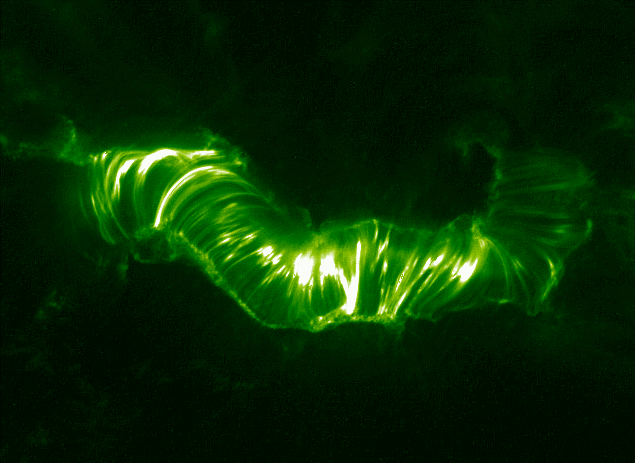
TRACE image of a coronal arcade

Wave and oscillatory phenomena are observed in the hot plasma of the corona mainly in EUV, optical and microwave bands with a number of spaceborne and ground-based instruments, e.g. the Solar and Heliospheric Observatory (SOHO), the Transition Region and Coronal Explorer (TRACE), the Nobeyama Radioheliograph (NoRH, see the Nobeyama radio observatory). Phenomenologically, researchers distinguish between compressible waves in polar plumes and in legs of large coronal loops, flare-generated transverse oscillations of loops, acoustic oscillations of loops, propagating kink waves in loops and in structures above arcades (an arcade being a close collection of loops in a cylindrical structure, see image to right), sausage oscillations of flaring loops, and oscillations of prominences and fibrils (see solar prominence), and this list is continuously updated.

Coronal seismology is one of the aims of the Atmospheric Imaging Assembly (AIA) instrument on the Solar Dynamics Observatory (SDO) mission.

A mission to send a spacecraft as close as 9 solar radii from the sun, Parker Solar Probe, was launched in 2018 with aims to provide in-situ measurements of the solar magnetic field, solar wind and corona. It includes a magnetometer and plasma wave sensor, allowing unprecedented observations for coronal seismology.

== Conclusions ==
The potential of coronal seismology in the estimation of the coronal magnetic field, density scale height, "fine structure" (by which is meant the variation in structure of an inhomogeneous structure such as an inhomogeneous coronal loop) and heating has been demonstrated by different research groups. Work relating to the coronal magnetic field was mentioned earlier. It has been shown that sufficiently broadband slow magnetoacoustic waves, consistent with currently available observations in the low frequency part of the spectrum, could provide the rate of heat deposition sufficient to heat a coronal loop. Regarding the density scale height, transverse oscillations of coronal loops that have both variable circular cross-sectional area and plasma density in the longitudinal direction have been studied theoretically. A second order ordinary differential equation has been derived describing the displacement of the loop axis. Together with boundary conditions, solving this equation determines the eigenfrequencies and eigenmodes. The coronal density scale height could then be estimated by using the observed ratio of the fundamental frequency and first overtone of loop kink oscillations. Little is known of coronal fine structure. Doppler shift oscillations in hot active region loops obtained with the Solar Ultraviolet Measurements of Emitted Radiation instrument (SUMER) aboard SOHO have been studied. The spectra were recorded along a 300 arcsec slit placed at a fixed position in the corona above the active regions. Some oscillations showed phase propagation along the slit in one or both directions with apparent speeds in the range of 8–102 km per second, together with distinctly different intensity and line width distributions along the slit. These features can be explained by the excitation of the oscillation at a footpoint of an inhomogeneous coronal loop, e.g. a loop with fine structure.
