= Magnetogravity wave =

Type of sound wave in an ionised gas

A magnetogravity wave is a type of plasma wave. A magnetogravity wave is an acoustic gravity wave which is associated with fluctuations in the background magnetic field. In this context, gravity wave refers to a classical fluid wave, and is completely unrelated to the relativistic gravitational wave.

== Examples ==
Magnetogravity waves are found in the corona of the Sun.

== See also ==
- Wave
- Plasma
- Magnetosonic wave
- Helioseismology
