= Boltzmann relation =

In a plasma, the Boltzmann relation describes the number density of an isothermal charged particle fluid when the thermal and the electrostatic forces acting on the fluid have reached equilibrium.

In many situations, the electron density of a plasma is assumed to behave according to the Boltzmann relation due to the electron's small mass and high mobility.

== Equation ==
If the local electrostatic potentials at two nearby locations are 𝜙_{1} and 𝜙_{2}, the Boltzmann relation for the electrons takes the form:
$$n_{e} (\phi_2) = n_{e} (\phi_1) e^{e (\phi_2-\phi_1)/k_\text{B} T_\text{e}}$$
where $n_{e}$ is the electron number density, $T_{e}$ is the electron temperature of the plasma, and $k_{\text{B}}$ is the Boltzmann constant.

== Derivation ==
A simple derivation of the Boltzmann relation for the electrons can be obtained using the momentum fluid equation of the two-fluid model of plasma physics in absence of a magnetic field. When the electrons reach dynamic equilibrium, the inertial and the collisional terms of the momentum equations are zero, and the only terms left in the equation are the pressure and electric terms
$$-\nabla p_{e} - e n_{e} \mathbf{E} = 0.$$
For an isothermal fluid, the pressure force takes the form
$$\mathbf{F}_{\rm fluid}=-k_\text{B}T_\text{e}\nabla n_\text{e},$$
while the electric term is
$$\mathbf{F}_{\rm electric}=e n_\text{e} \nabla\phi,$$
where $\phi$ is the electrostatic potential. Integration leads to the expression given above.

The derivation can also be extended to take into account a magnetic field. The Lorentz force is given by
$$\mathbf{F}_{\rm magnetic}= -e n_{e} \mathbf{v}_{e} \times \mathbf{B},$$
where $\mathbf{v}_{e}$ is the electron fluid velocity and $\mathbf{B}$ is the magnetic field. Then, force balance reads
$$-\nabla p_{e} - e n_{e} \mathbf{E} - e n_{e} \mathbf{v}_{e} \times \mathbf{B} = 0.$$
We make a slightly modified assumptions of isothermality: rather than assuming a constant electron temperature, assume that
$$\mathbf{B} \cdot \nabla T_{e} = 0.$$
This implies that the electron temperature is purely a function of the flux label $\psi$, which satisfies the property that $\mathbf{B} \cdot \nabla \psi = 0.$ We then take the dot product of the force balance equation with $\mathbf{B}$ and integrate to find
$$n_{e} = n_{e0}(\psi) e^{e \phi /k_\text{B} T_\text{e} (\psi)},$$
where $n_{e0}$ is a function of integration.

In many problems of plasma physics, it is not useful to calculate the electric potential on the basis of the Poisson equation because the electron and ion densities are not known a priori. Moreover, quasineutrality means the net charge density is the small difference of two large quantities, the electron and ion charge densities. If the electron density is known and the assumptions hold sufficiently well, the electric potential can be calculated simply from the Boltzmann relation.

== Inaccurate situations ==
Discrepancies with the Boltzmann relation can occur, for example, when oscillations occur so fast that the electrons cannot find a new equilibrium (see e.g. plasma oscillations) or when the electrons are prevented from moving by a magnetic field (see e.g. lower hybrid oscillations).
