= Alfvén wave =

Low-frequency plasma wave

A cluster of double layers forming in an Alfvén wave, about a sixth of the distance from the left. Red = electrons, Green = ions, Yellow = electric potential, Orange = parallel electric field, Pink = charge density, Blue = magnetic field

In plasma physics, an Alfvén wave, named after Hannes Alfvén, is a type of plasma wave in which ions oscillate in response to a restoring force provided by an effective tension on the magnetic field lines.

Discovered theoretically by Alfvén in 1942—work that contributed to his 1970 Nobel Prize in Physics—these waves play a fundamental role in numerous astrophysical and laboratory plasma phenomena. Alfvén waves are observed in the solar corona, solar wind, Earth's magnetosphere, fusion plasmas, and various astrophysical settings. They are particularly significant for their role in the coronal heating problem, energy transport in the solar atmosphere, particle acceleration, and plasma heating.

Unlike some other plasma waves, Alfvén waves are typically non-compressive and dispersionless in the simplest MHD description, though more complex variants such as kinetic and inertial Alfvén waves emerge in certain plasma regimes. The characteristic speed of these waves—the Alfvén velocity—depends on the magnetic field strength and the plasma density, making these waves an important diagnostic tool for magnetized plasma environments.

== Definition ==
An Alfvén wave is a low-frequency (compared to the ion gyrofrequency) travelling oscillation of the ions and magnetic field in a plasma. The ion mass density provides the inertia and the magnetic field line tension provides the restoring force. Alfvén waves propagate in the direction of the magnetic field, and the motion of the ions and the perturbation of the magnetic field are transverse to the direction of propagation. However, Alfvén waves existing at oblique incidences will smoothly change into magnetosonic waves when the propagation is perpendicular to the magnetic field.

Alfvén waves are dispersionless.

== Alfvén velocity ==
The low-frequency relative permittivity $\varepsilon$ of a magnetized plasma is given by
$$\varepsilon = 1 + \frac{c^2\,\mu_0\,\rho}{B^2}$$
where B is the magnetic flux density, $c$ is the speed of light, $\mu_0$ is the permeability of the vacuum, and the mass density is the sum
$$\rho = \sum_s n_s m_s ,$$
over all species of charged plasma particles (electrons as well as all types of ions). Here species $s$ has number density $n_s$ and mass per particle $m_s$.

The phase velocity of an electromagnetic wave in such a medium is
$$v = \frac{c}{\sqrt{\varepsilon}} = \frac{c}{\sqrt{1 + \dfrac{c^2 \mu_0 \rho}{B^2}}}$$
For the case of an Alfvén wave
$$v = \frac{v_A}{\sqrt{1 + \dfrac{v_A^2}{c^2}}}$$
where
$$v_A \equiv \frac{B}{\sqrt{\mu_0\,\rho}}$$
is the Alfvén wave group velocity. (The formula for the phase velocity assumes that the plasma particles are moving at non-relativistic speeds, the mass-weighted particle velocity is zero in the frame of reference, and the wave is propagating parallel to the magnetic field vector.)

If $v_A \ll c$, then $v \approx v_A$. On the other hand, when $v_A \to \infty$, $v \to c$. That is, at high field or low density, the group velocity of the Alfvén wave approaches the speed of light, and the Alfvén wave becomes an ordinary electromagnetic wave.

Neglecting the contribution of the electrons to the mass density, $\rho = n_i \, m_i$, where $n_i$ is the ion number density and $m_i$ is the mean ion mass per particle, so that
$$v_A \approx \left(2.18 \times 10^{11}\,\text{cm}\,\text{s}^{-1}\right) \left(\frac{m_i}{m_p}\right)^{-\frac{1}{2}} \left(\frac{n_i}{1~\text{cm}^{-3}}\right)^{-\frac{1}{2}} \left(\frac{B}{1~\text{G}}\right).$$

== Alfvén time ==
In plasma physics, the Alfvén time $\tau_A$ is an important timescale for wave phenomena. It is related to the Alfvén velocity by:
$$\tau_A = \frac{a}{v_A}$$
where $a$ denotes the characteristic scale of the system. For example, $a$ could be the minor radius of the torus in a tokamak.

== Relativistic case ==
The Alfvén wave velocity in relativistic magnetohydrodynamics is
$$v = \frac{c}{\sqrt{1 + \dfrac{e + P}{2 P_m}}}$$
where e is the total energy density of plasma particles, $P$ is the total plasma pressure, and
$$P_m = \frac{B^2}{2 \mu_0}$$
is the magnetic pressure. In the non-relativistic limit, where $P \ll e \approx \rho c^2$, this formula reduces to the one given previously.

== Alfvén wave modes ==
Alfvén waves can propagate in different modes depending on the plasma conditions. The most important modes include:

=== Shear Alfvén waves ===
The classical or shear Alfvén wave is an incompressible transverse wave where the perturbations of magnetic field and velocity are perpendicular to the direction of the background magnetic field and the wave vector. In an ideal MHD plasma, these waves propagate strictly along the magnetic field lines at the Alfvén velocity.

=== Inertial Alfvén waves ===
When the perpendicular wavelength becomes comparable to the electron skin depth (c/ω_{pe}, where ω_{pe} is the electron plasma frequency) and β << m_{e}/m_{i} (where β is the ratio of plasma pressure to magnetic pressure), the wave is called an inertial Alfvén wave. In this regime, electron inertia becomes important, and the wave develops a significant parallel electric field component, making these waves important for particle acceleration in space plasmas.

=== Kinetic Alfvén waves ===
When the perpendicular wavelength becomes comparable to the ion gyroradius and β ~ 1, the wave is called a kinetic Alfvén wave. These waves arise from the coupling between shear Alfvén waves and ion acoustic waves when finite ion Larmor radius effects are included. Kinetic Alfvén waves are important for energy dissipation in space plasmas and may play a significant role in solar wind heating.

== Alfvén Mach number ==
The Alfvén Mach number (M_{A}) is a dimensionless quantity defined as the ratio of the flow velocity to the Alfvén velocity:

$$\mathrm{M}_A = \frac{v}{v_A}$$

where v is the flow velocity and v_{A} is the Alfvén velocity. The Alfvén Mach number has several important applications:

- When M_{A} < 1, the flow is sub-Alfvénic, meaning that Alfvén waves can propagate upstream against the flow.
- When M_{A} > 1, the flow is super-Alfvénic, and Alfvén waves are swept downstream by the flow.
- At critical points where M_{A} = 1, important transitions in plasma behaviour occur, such as in solar wind acceleration or in magnetospheric boundary regions.

The Alfvén Mach number is particularly important in understanding the interaction of the solar wind with planetary magnetospheres, the formation of shock waves in space plasmas, and the dynamics of astrophysical jets.

== History ==
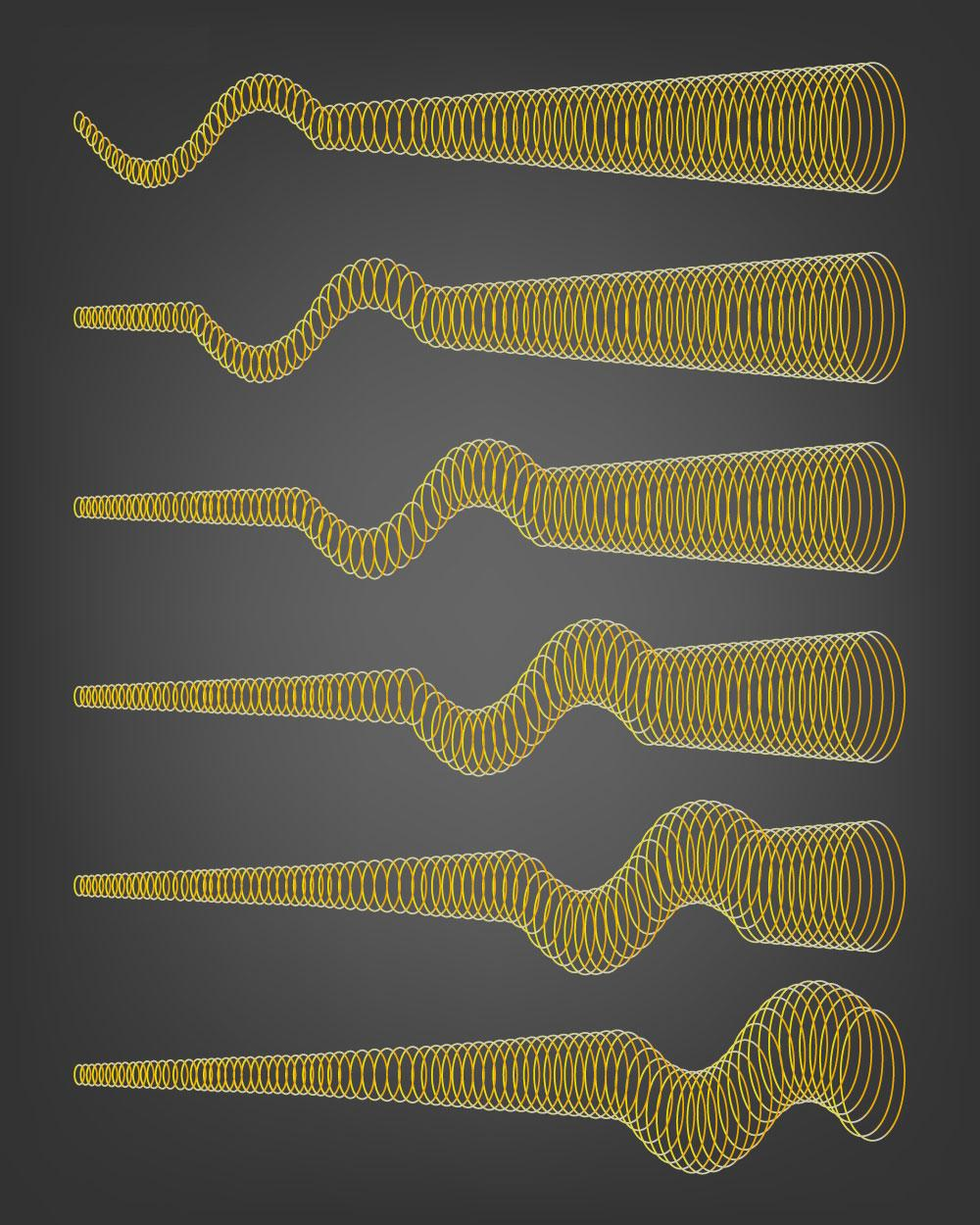
Magnetic waves, called Alfvén S-waves, flow from the base of black hole jets.

=== The coronal heating problem ===
The study of Alfvén waves began from the coronal heating problem, a longstanding question in heliophysics. It was unclear why the temperature of the solar corona is hot (about one million kelvins) compared to its surface (the photosphere), which is only a few thousand kelvins. Intuitively, it would make sense to see a decrease in temperature when moving away from a heat source, but this does not seem to be the case even though the photosphere is denser and would generate more heat than the corona.

In 1942, Hannes Alfvén proposed in Nature the existence of an electromagnetic-hydrodynamic wave which would carry energy from the photosphere to heat up the corona and the solar wind. He claimed that the sun had all the necessary criteria to support these waves and they may in turn be responsible for sun spots. He stated:

If a conducting liquid is placed in a constant magnetic field, every motion of the liquid gives rise to an E.M.F. which produces electric currents. Owing to the magnetic field, these currents give mechanical forces which change the state of motion of the liquid. Thus a kind of combined electromagnetic–hydrodynamic wave is produced.

This would eventually turn out to be Alfvén waves. He received the 1970 Nobel Prize in Physics for this discovery.

=== Experimental studies and observations ===
The convection zone of the Sun, the region beneath the photosphere in which energy is transported primarily by convection, is sensitive to the motion of the core due to the rotation of the Sun. Together with varying pressure gradients beneath the surface, electromagnetic fluctuations produced in the convection zone induce random motion on the photospheric surface and produce Alfvén waves. The waves then leave the surface, travel through the chromosphere and transition zone, and interact with the ionized plasma. The wave itself carries energy and some of the electrically charged plasma.

In the early 1990s, de Pontieu and Haerendel suggested that Alfvén waves may also be associated with the plasma jets known as spicules. It was theorized these brief spurts of superheated gas were carried by the combined energy and momentum of their own upward velocity, as well as the oscillating transverse motion of the Alfvén waves.

In 2007, Alfvén waves were reportedly observed for the first time traveling towards the corona by Tomczyk et al., but their predictions could not conclude that the energy carried by the Alfvén waves was sufficient to heat the corona to its enormous temperatures, for the observed amplitudes of the waves were not high enough. However, in 2011, McIntosh et al. reported the observation of highly energetic Alfvén waves combined with energetic spicules which could sustain heating the corona to its million-kelvin temperature. These observed amplitudes (20.0 km/s against 2007's observed 0.5 km/s) contained over one hundred times more energy than the ones observed in 2007. The short period of the waves also allowed more energy transfer into the coronal atmosphere. The 50,000 km-long spicules may also play a part in accelerating the solar wind past the corona. Alfvén waves are routinely observed in solar wind, in particular in fast solar wind streams. The role of Alfvénic oscillations in the interaction between fast solar wind and the Earth's magnetosphere is currently under debate.

However, the above-mentioned discoveries of Alfvén waves in the complex Sun's atmosphere, starting from the Hinode era in 2007 for the next 10 years, mostly fall in the realm of Alfvénic waves essentially generated as a mixed mode due to transverse structuring of the magnetic and plasma properties in the localized flux tubes. In 2009, Jess et al. reported the periodic variation of H-alpha line-width as observed by Swedish Solar Telescope (SST) above chromospheric bright-points. They claimed first direct detection of the long-period (126–700 s), incompressible, torsional Alfvén waves in the lower solar atmosphere.

After the seminal work of Jess et al. (2009), in 2017 Srivastava et al. detected the existence of high-frequency torsional Alfvén waves in the Sun's chromospheric fine-structured flux tubes. They discovered that these high-frequency waves carry substantial energy capable of heating the Sun's corona and also originating the supersonic solar wind. In 2018, using spectral imaging observations, non-LTE (local thermodynamic equilibrium) inversions and magnetic field extrapolations of sunspot atmospheres, Grant et al. found evidence for elliptically polarized Alfvén waves forming fast-mode shocks in the outer regions of the chromospheric umbral atmosphere. They provided quantification of the degree of physical heat provided by the dissipation of such Alfvén wave modes above active region spots.

In 2024, a paper was published in the journal Science detailing a set of observations of what turned out to be the same jet of solar wind made by Parker Solar Probe and Solar Orbiter in February 2022, and implying Alfvén waves were what kept the jet's energy high enough to match the observations.

== Historical timeline ==
- 1942: Alfvén suggests the existence of electromagnetic-hydromagnetic waves in a paper published in Nature 150, 405–406 (1942).
- 1949: Laboratory experiments by S. Lundquist produce such waves in magnetized mercury, with a velocity that approximated Alfvén's formula.
- 1949: Enrico Fermi uses Alfvén waves in his theory of cosmic rays.
- 1950: Alfvén publishes the first edition of his book, Cosmical Electrodynamics, detailing hydromagnetic waves, and discussing their application to both laboratory and space plasmas.
- 1952: Additional confirmation appears in experiments by Winston Bostick and Morton Levine with ionized helium.
- 1954: Bo Lehnert produces Alfvén waves in liquid sodium.
- 1958: Eugene Parker suggests hydromagnetic waves in the interstellar medium.
- 1958: Berthold, Harris, and Hope detect Alfvén waves in the ionosphere after the Argus nuclear test, generated by the explosion, and traveling at speeds predicted by Alfvén formula.
- 1958: Eugene Parker suggests hydromagnetic waves in the Solar corona extending into the Solar wind.
- 1959: D. F. Jephcott produces Alfvén waves in a gas discharge.
- 1959: C. H. Kelley and J. Yenser produce Alfvén waves in the ambient atmosphere.
- 1960: Coleman et al. report the measurement of Alfvén waves by the magnetometer aboard the Pioneer and Explorer satellites.
- 1961: Sugiura suggests evidence of hydromagnetic waves in the Earth's magnetic field.
- 1961: Normal Alfvén modes and resonances in liquid sodium are studied by Jameson.
- 1966: R. O. Motz generates and observes Alfvén waves in mercury.
- 1970: Hannes Alfvén wins the 1970 Nobel Prize in Physics for "fundamental work and discoveries in magneto-hydrodynamics with fruitful applications in different parts of plasma physics".
- 1973: Eugene Parker suggests hydromagnetic waves in the intergalactic medium.
- 1974: J. V. Hollweg suggests the existence of hydromagnetic waves in interplanetary space.
- 1977: Mendis and Ip suggest the existence of hydromagnetic waves in the coma of Comet Kohoutek.
- 1984: Roberts et al. predict the presence of standing MHD waves in the solar corona and opens the field of coronal seismology.
- 1999: Aschwanden et al. and Nakariakov et al. report the detection of damped transverse oscillations of solar coronal loops observed with the extreme ultraviolet (EUV) imager on board the Transition Region And Coronal Explorer (TRACE), interpreted as standing kink (or "Alfvénic") oscillations of the loops. This confirms the theoretical prediction of Roberts et al. (1984).
- 2007: Tomczyk et al. reported the detection of Alfvénic waves in images of the solar corona with the Coronal Multi-Channel Polarimeter (CoMP) instrument at the National Solar Observatory, New Mexico. However, these observations turned out to be kink waves of coronal plasma structures.doi:10.1051/0004-6361/200911840
- 2007: A special issue on the Hinode space observatory was released in the journal Science. Alfvén wave signatures in the coronal atmosphere were observed by Cirtain et al., Okamoto et al., and De Pontieu et al. By estimating the observed waves' energy density, De Pontieu et al. have shown that the energy associated with the waves is sufficient to heat the corona and accelerate the solar wind.
- 2008: Kaghashvili et al. uses driven wave fluctuations as a diagnostic tool to detect Alfvén waves in the solar corona.
- 2009: Jess et al. detect torsional Alfvén waves in the structured Sun's chromosphere using the Swedish Solar Telescope.
- 2011: Alfvén waves are shown to propagate in a liquid metal alloy made of Gallium.
- 2017: 3D numerical modelling performed by Srivastava et al. show that the high-frequency (12–42 mHz) Alfvén waves detected by the Swedish Solar Telescope can carry substantial energy to heat the Sun's inner corona.
- 2018: Using spectral imaging observations, non-LTE inversions and magnetic field extrapolations of sunspot atmospheres, Grant et al. found evidence for elliptically polarized Alfvén waves forming fast-mode shocks in the outer regions of the chromospheric umbral atmosphere. For the first time, these authors provided quantification of the degree of physical heat provided by the dissipation of such Alfvén wave modes.
- 2024: Alfvén waves are implied to be behind a smaller than expected energy loss in solar wind jets out as far as Venus' orbit, based on Parker Solar Probe and Solar Orbiter observations only two days apart.

== See also ==
- Alfvén surface
- Computational magnetohydrodynamics
- Electrohydrodynamics
- Electromagnetic pump
- Ferrofluid
- Magnetic flow meter
- Magnetohydrodynamic turbulence
- MHD generator
- MHD sensor
- Molten salt
- Plasma stability
- Shocks and discontinuities (magnetohydrodynamics)
