= Electron wake =

Phenomena in atomic physics

Electron wake is the disturbance left after a high-energy charged particle passes through condensed matter or plasma. Ions passing through can introduce periodic oscillations in the crystal lattice or plasma wave with the characteristic frequency of the crystal or plasma frequency. Interactions of the field created by these oscillations with the charged particle field alternate from constructive interference to destructive interference, producing alternating waves of electric field and displacement. The frequency of the wake field is determined by the nature of the penetrated matter, and the period of the wake field is directly proportional to the speed of the incoming charged particle. The amplitude of the first wake wave is the most important, as it produces a braking force on the charged particle, eventually slowing it down. Wake fields also can capture and guide lightweight ions or positrons in the direction perpendicular to the wake. The larger the speed of the original charged particle, the larger the angle between the initial particle's velocity and the captured ion's velocity.

== See also ==
- Coulomb explosion
- Charged particle beam
- Wake fields
- Plasma acceleration
- Bremsstrahlung
