= Mary Taylor Slow =

British physicist

- Born: Mary Taylor; 15 July 1898; Sheffield, England
- Died: 26 May 1984 (aged 85); Malvern, Worcestershire, England
- Education: University of Cambridge; University of Göttingen
- Scientific career
- Fields: Radiophysics
- Workplaces: National Physics Laboratory
- Thesis: Die Ausbreitung elektromagnetischer Wellen eines horizontalen Dipols über die Erdkugel (1926)

Mary Taylor Slow (15 July 1898 – 26 May 1984) was a British physicist who worked on the theory of radio waves and the application of differential equations to physics. She was the first woman to take up the study of radio as a profession.

== Early life and education ==
Mary Taylor was born in Sheffield, England. Both her parents were schoolteachers. She was educated at Pomona Street Elementary School in Sheffield and then Sheffield High School, from which she won a Clothworker's Scholarship to Girton College, Cambridge. She studied the Natural Sciences Tripos; in 1919 she was awarded the equivalent of a first-class BA degree, and in 1920 she graduated in mathematics and natural sciences.

== Career and research ==
Taylor continued to study at Girton College under a series of research studentships. From 1922 to 1924 she was Assistant Lecturer in Mathematics at Girton. During this time she became interested in the theory of radio waves and started to conduct research under the guidance of Edward Appleton who was then assistant demonstrator in experimental physics at the Cavendish Laboratory in Cambridge.

When Appleton left Cambridge to join King's College, London, Taylor moved from Cambridge to the University of Göttingen in Germany. Here she was awarded her PhD in 1926 for a thesis on aspects of electromagnetic waves that she wrote in German. Taylor was awarded a Yarrow Research Fellowship which enabled her to remain at Göttingen and continue her work on electromagnetic waves with Richard Courant.

In 1929 Taylor returned to the UK and took up a post as scientific officer at the Radio Research Station in Slough, Berkshire (part of the UK Department of Scientific and Industrial Research and the UK National Physics Laboratory, now the National Physical Laboratory). Here she continued to carry out research into the theory of electromagnetic waves, specialising in the magneto-ionic theory of radio wave propagation and in the application of differential equations to physics and radio. During this period she published two papers in the Proceedings of the Physical Society, both on aspects of the Appleton–Hartree equation. Taylor was a member of the London Mathematical Society and the Cambridge Philosophical Society.

== Personal life ==
In 1934 Taylor married Ernest Clive Slow; under the Civil Service Rules of the time this meant that she had to leave her post at the Radio Research Station. The couple had two daughters. Taylor worked for the publication Wireless Engineer, translating and abstracting papers relating to radio. At some point Clive Slow took up a post in the Air Defence Research and Development Establishment, and the family moved to Malvern. From this point Taylor taught mathematics in local schools including Worcester Grammar School for Girls and Lawnside School in Malvern.

She died in Malvern on 26 May 1984.
