= Missing baryon problem =

Unresolved discrepancy in cosmology

In cosmology, the missing baryon problem is an observed discrepancy between the amount of baryonic matter detected from shortly after the Big Bang and from more recent epochs. Observations of the cosmic microwave background and Big Bang nucleosynthesis studies have set constraints on the abundance of baryons in the early universe, finding that baryonic matter accounts for approximately 4.8% of the energy contents of the universe. At the same time, a census of baryons in the recent observable universe has found that observed baryonic matter accounts for less than half of that amount. This discrepancy is commonly known as the missing baryon problem. The missing baryon problem is different from the dark matter problem, which is non-baryonic in nature.

== Early universe measurements ==
The abundance of baryonic matter in the early universe can be obtained indirectly from two independent methods:

- The theory of Big Bang nucleosynthesis, which predicts the observed relative abundance of the chemical elements in observations of the recent universe. Higher numbers of baryons in the early universe should produce higher ratios for helium, lithium, and heavier elements relative to hydrogen. Agreement with observed abundances requires that baryonic matter makes up between 4–5% of the universe's critical density.
- Detailed analysis of the small fluctuations (anisotropies) in the cosmic microwave background (CMB), especially the second peak of the CMB power spectrum. Baryonic matter interacts with photons and therefore leaves a visible imprint on the CMB. CMB analysis also yields a baryon fraction on the order of 5%.

The CMB constraint is much more precise than the BBN constraint, but the two are in agreement.

== Late universe observations ==
The density of baryonic matter can be obtained directly by summing up all the known baryonic matter. This is highly nontrivial, since although luminous matter such as stars and galaxies are easily summed, baryonic matter can also exist in highly non-luminous form, such as black holes, planets, and highly diffuse interstellar gas. Nonetheless, it can still be done, using a range of techniques:

- Making use of the Lyman-alpha forest; clouds of diffuse, baryonic gas or dust are sometimes visible when backlit by stars. The resulting spectra can be used to infer the mass between the star and the observer.
- Gravitational microlensing. If a planet or other dark object moves between the observer and a faraway source, the image of the source is distorted. The mass of the dark object can be inferred based on the amount of distortion.
- Sunyaev–Zel'dovich effect. The interaction between CMB photons and free electrons leaves an imprint in the CMB. This effect is sensitive to all free electrons independently of their temperature or the density of the surrounding medium, and thus it can be used to study baryonic matter otherwise not hot enough to be detected.

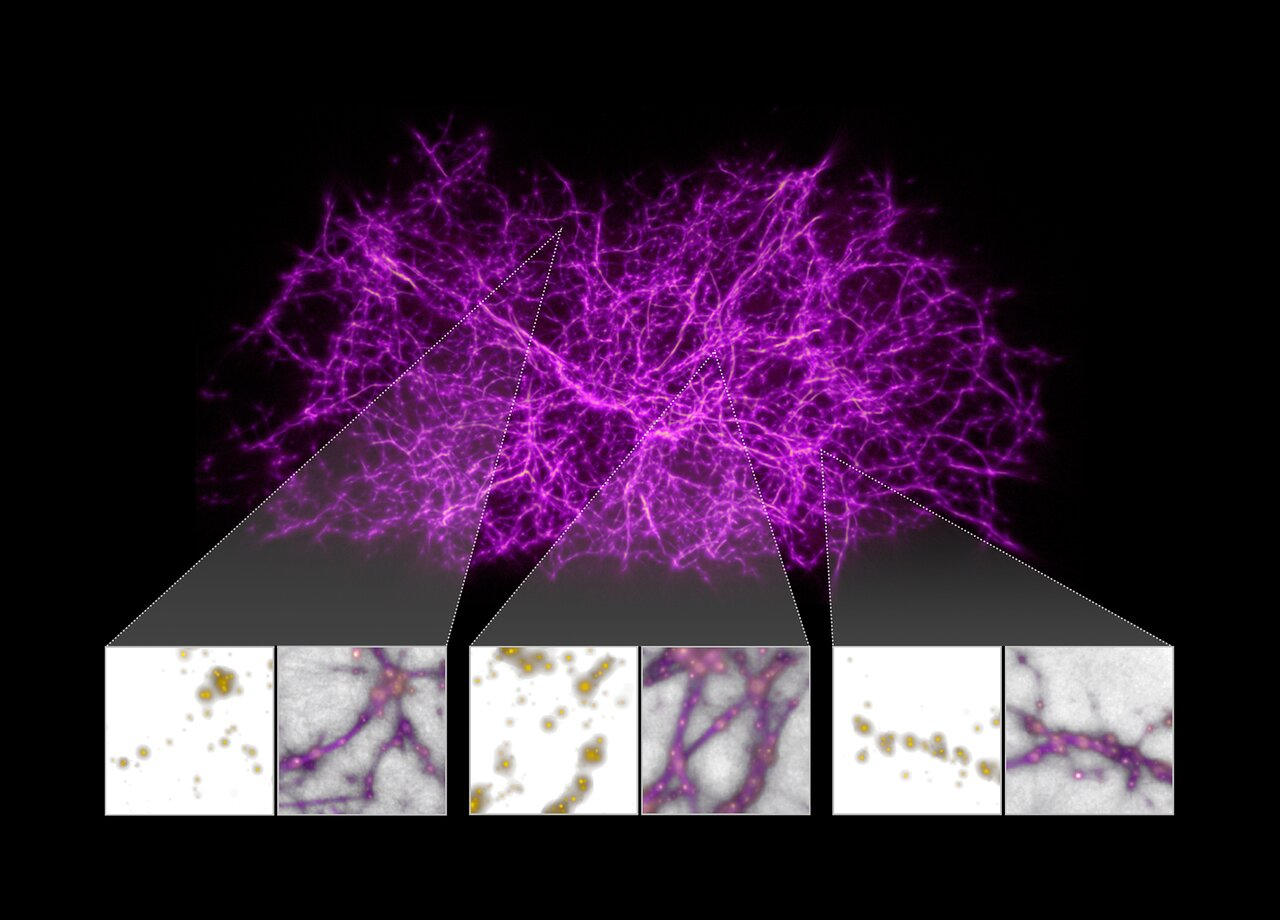
Generated image of the cosmic web which contains warm-hot regions where the missing baryons have been detected.

Prior to 2017, baryons were found to be distributed 10% inside galaxies, 50–60% in the circum-galactic medium, and 30–40% unaccounted, therefore accounting for about 70% of theoretical predictions.

Large scale galaxy surveys in the 2000s revealed a baryon deficit. This led theorists to reexamine their models and predict that gas must flow between galaxies and galaxy clusters.

=== Warm-hot intergalactic medium ===
The Lambda-CDM model of the big bang predicts that matter between galaxies in the universe is distributed in web-like formations with a low density (1–10 particles per cubic meter) known as the Warm-hot intergalactic medium (WHIM). Cosmological hydrodynamical simulations from theory predict that a fraction of the missing baryons are located in galactic haloes at temperatures of 10^{6} K and the (WHIM) at temperatures of 10^{5}–10^{7} K, with recent observations providing strong support. The WHIM is composed of three states:

- A warm state with temperatures 10^{5}–10^{5.7} K. Neutral hydrogen is present in this state. (Observed via Oxygen-VI absorption lines)
- A hot state with temperatures of 10^{5.7}–10^{6.3} K. (Observed via Oxygen-VII in soft x-rays)
- A very hot state with temperatures of 10^{6.3}–10^{7} K. Very few hydrogen or hydrogen like metals, mostly present near the outskirts of galaxy clusters.

The warm phase of the WHIM had been previously detected and composes around 15% of the baryon content. The WHIM is mostly composed of ionized hydrogen. This creates difficulty for astronomers trying to detect baryons in the WHIM. It is easier to detect the WHIM through highly ionized oxygen such as OVI and OVII absorption.

== Universe composition ==
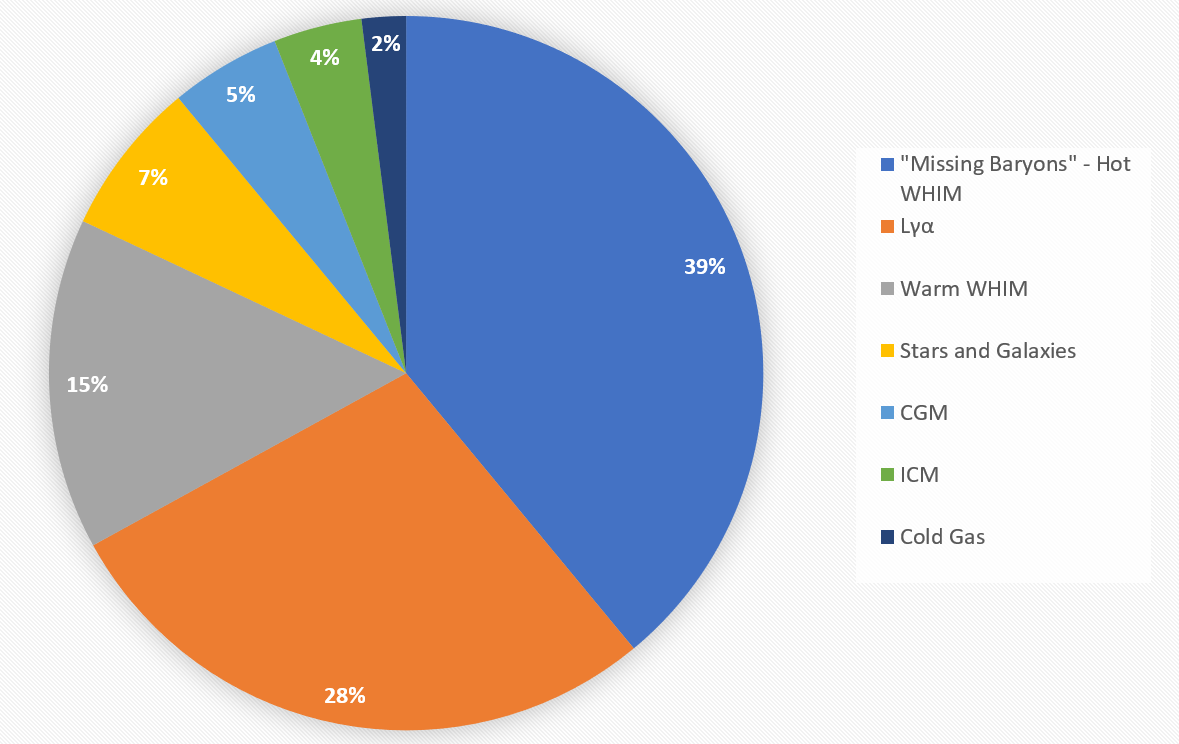
The distribution of known baryons in the universe.

The census of known baryons in the universe tallied to around 60% of total baryons until the resolution of the missing baryon problem. This is in distinction from composition of the entire universe which includes dark energy and dark matter of which baryonic matter composes only 5%. Around 7% of baryons exists in stars and galaxies, while most of it exists around galaxies or galaxy clusters. The Lyman-alpha forest contains around 28% of the baryons. The warm phase of the WHIM was detected by soft X-ray absorption in 2012 to establish 15% of total baryon content. The intracluster medium (ICM) accounts for around 4% of total baryon content. It is composed of mostly ionized hydrogen and is about 10% of a galaxy cluster's total mass; the rest being dark matter. The ICM is low density with around 10^{−3} particles per cm^{3}. The circum-galactic medium (CGM) was confirmed in 2003 by Chandra and Xmm-Newton. The CGM is a large sphere surrounding galaxies with a radius > 70 - 200 kpc. The CGM accounts for 5% of total baryons in the universe.

== Detection methods ==
There are three main methods of detecting the WHIM where the missing baryons lie: the Sunyaev–Zel'dovich effect, Lyman-alpha emission lines, and metal absorption lines.

Sunyaev–Zel'dovich effect

The thermal Sunyaev–Zel'dovich (tSZ) effect occurs when photons from the CMB inverse Compton scatter off ionized gas. For detecting baryons, the ionized gas from the WHIM is scattered by the CMB photons. The y-parameter quantifies the strength of the tSZ effect and is defined as:

$y=\int \frac{k_{\rm B}T_e}{m_ec^2}n_e\sigma_Td\ell$,

where $k_b$ is the Boltzmann constant, $\sigma_T$ is the Thompson cross-section, $n_e$ is electron number density, $m_ec^2$ is the electron rest mass energy, and $T_e$ is the temperature. Finding the y-parameter and overlaying that with a map of cosmic filament from millions of galaxies allows astronomers to find the weak signal from the WHIM. The y-parameter signal from a galaxy pair is overlaid on a model for galaxy halos. The signals are subtracted to reveal a signal between the two galaxies. This resulting signal is the filament. To ensure the signal is not coming from any other source, astronomers generate a control simulation which they use to compare and are able to determine that source must be from the WHIM.

Lyman-alpha emission

The Lyman-alpha (Lyα) emission lines are detected from ionized hydrogen in cosmic filament. A source, such as a quasar, ionizes hydrogen in the cosmic filament leaving detectable dips in the absorption lines.

Metal absorption lines

Highly ionized oxygen like O^{+6}, O^{+7}, and O^{+8} absorption lines in the soft X-rays at energies of 0.6–0.8 keV. The column density of these lines $F(N_O)$ can be derived:

$$\Omega_{O}=\frac{H_0m_O}{c\rho_c}\int_{0}^{\infty}F(N_O)N_OdN_O$$,

where $\Omega_O$ is the abundance of a particular oxygen ion, $H_0$ is Hubble's constant, $\rho_c$ is the critical density $\rho_c = \frac{3H^2}{8\pi G}$.

== Claimed resolutions ==
In general, the missing baryon problem is a major unsolved problem in physics. Various scientists have proposed explanations, but none have received acceptance as adequately addressing the issue.

One claim of a solution was published in 2017 when two groups of scientists said they found evidence for the location of missing baryons in intergalactic matter. The missing baryons had been postulated to exist as hot strands between galaxy pairs in the Warm-hot intergalactic medium (WHIM). Since the strands are diffuse and they are not hot enough to emit x-rays, they are difficult to detect. The groups used the thermal Sunyaev–Zeldovich effect to measure the density of the strands in the local universe. If baryons are present there, then some amount of energy should be lost when light from the cosmic microwave background scatters off them. These show up as very dim patches in the CMB. The patches are too dim to see directly, but when overlaid with the visible galaxy distribution, become detectable. The density of the strands comes up to about 30% of the baryonic density, which the groups said was the exact amount needed to solve the problem. Even if granted to be accurate, these works only describe the distribution of baryons between nearby galaxies and do not provide a complete picture of cosmic gas in the late universe.

A 2021 article postulated that approximately 50% of all baryonic matter is outside dark matter haloes, filling the space between galaxies, and that this would explain the missing baryons not accounted for in the 2017 paper.

== Late 2010s and early 2020s ==
In the late 2010s and early 2020s, several groups observed the intergalactic medium and circum-galactic medium to obtain more measurements and observations of baryons to support the leading observations. Baryons have more or less been found, so groups are working to detect them to a higher level of significance. Methods used include soft X-ray, OVI, OVII, and OVIII absorption.

In 2019, a group led by Orsolya E. Kovács detected OVII absorption in the X-ray spectrum of 17 stacked quasars, corresponding to WHIM in filaments of overdensity around 5–9 times the average cosmological density at the epochs of the individual quasars. In 2020 astrophysicists reported the first direct X-ray emissions measurement of baryonic matter of cosmic web filaments. Both results are consistent with WHIM accounting for the missing baryons.
