= Wilhelm Altar =

Austrian-born theoretical physicist

- Born: Wilhelm Altar; 27 August 1900; Vienna, Austria
- Died: 1 January 1995 (aged 94); Los Angeles, United States
- Education: University of Vienna
- Known for: Significant contributions to ionospheric physics and improvements to radar detection of enemy aircraft in World War II
- Scientific career
- Fields: Physics
- Workplaces: King's College London; Pennsylvania State University; Princeton University

Wilhelm Altar (August 27, 1900 – January 1, 1995), known to family and colleagues as William Altar, was an Austrian-born theoretical physicist whose significant contributions led to the development of the magneto-ionic theory. Altar contributed to the mathematical and conceptual underpinnings that were verified by Appleton's research, in collaboration with Dr. Altar. Altar was not credited with his contributions until 1982, decades after Appleton received the 1947 Nobel Prize in Physics.

== Biography ==
Altar was born in Vienna in 1900. In 1923 he obtained a doctorate in theoretical physics from the University of Vienna. Due to the poor job market post World War I, Altar, in 1925, moved to his uncle's home in London. In London Professor A. O. Ranking at Imperial College introduced him to Edward Appleton in King's College London.

In the 1930s he moved to the United States where he joined the physics department of Pennsylvania State University. From 1935 to 1937 he served as a researcher at the Frick Chemical Laboratory at Princeton University, working on a study of optical rotatory power in organic molecules. On several occasions, Altar had tea and discussions about physics with Albert Einstein in their native German language.

== Appleton–Altar approach ==
During his time in King's College, Altar and Appleton made slow progress every day. The Appleton–Altar approach was an exercise in Lorentzian magneto-optics.
