= Upper hybrid oscillation =

Phenomenon in plasma physics

In plasma physics, an upper hybrid oscillation is a mode of oscillation of a magnetized plasma. It consists of a longitudinal motion of the electrons perpendicular to the magnetic field with the dispersion relation

$$\omega^2 = \omega_{pe}^2 + \omega_{ce}^2 + 3 k^2 v_{\mathrm{e,th}}^2$$,

where (in cgs units)

$$\omega_{pe} = (4\pi n_ee^2/m_e)^{1/2}$$

is the electron plasma frequency, and

$$\omega_{ce} = eB/{m_e c}$$

is the electron cyclotron frequency.

This oscillation is closely related to the plasma oscillation found in unmagnetized plasmas or parallel to the magnetic field, where the ω_{pe} term arises from the electrostatic Coulomb restoring force and the 3k²v_{e,th}² term arises from the restoring force of electron pressure. In the upper hybrid oscillation there is an additional restoring force due to the Lorentz force. Consider a plane wave where all perturbed quantities vary as exp(i(kx-ωt)). If the displacement in the direction of propagation is δ_{x}, then

$$v_x = -i\omega\delta$$
$$f_y = nev_x B_z/c = -i\omega(neB_z/c)\delta$$
$$v_y = -f_y/i\omega nm = (eB_z/mc)\delta$$
$$f_x = -nev_y B_z/c = -(nm)(eB_z/mc)^2\delta$$
$$a_x = -\omega_{ce}^2\delta$$

Thus the perpendicular magnetic field effectively provides a harmonic restoring force with a frequency ω_{ce}, explaining the third term in the dispersion relation. The particle orbits (or fluid trajectories) are ellipses in the plane perpendicular to the magnetic field, elongated in the direction of propagation.

The frequency of long wavelength oscillations is a "hybrid", or mix, of the electron plasma and electron cyclotron frequencies,

$$\omega_h^2 = \omega_{pe}^2 + \omega_{ce}^2$$,

and is known as the upper hybrid frequency. There are also a lower hybrid frequency and lower hybrid oscillations.

For propagation at angles oblique to the magnetic field, two modes exist simultaneously. If the plasma frequency is higher than the cyclotron frequency, then the upper hybrid oscillation transforms continuously into the plasma oscillation. The frequency of the other mode varies between the cyclotron frequency and zero. Otherwise, the frequency of the mode related to the upper hybrid oscillation remains above the cyclotron frequency, and the mode related to the plasma oscillation remains below the plasma frequency. In particular, the frequencies are given by

$$\omega^2 = (1/2)\omega_h^2\,\left(
1 \pm \sqrt{
1 - \left(
\frac{\cos\theta}{\omega_h^2/2 \omega_c\omega_p}
\right)^2
}
\right)$$

== See also ==
- Plasma oscillation
- Lower hybrid oscillation
