= Collisionless =

Collisionless may refer to:

- In information theory and computer science, computer networking architectures where collisions between packets of data cannot occur
- In computer science, situations where collisions, or occurrences of the same value, cannot occur in a structure (and prevent reliable lookups)
- In cosmology and physics, a medium in which the interaction cross-section between particles is so low that collisions between particles have no significant effect on the system. See Shock waves in astrophysics.
