= Shock waves in astrophysics =

Astrophysics shock waves

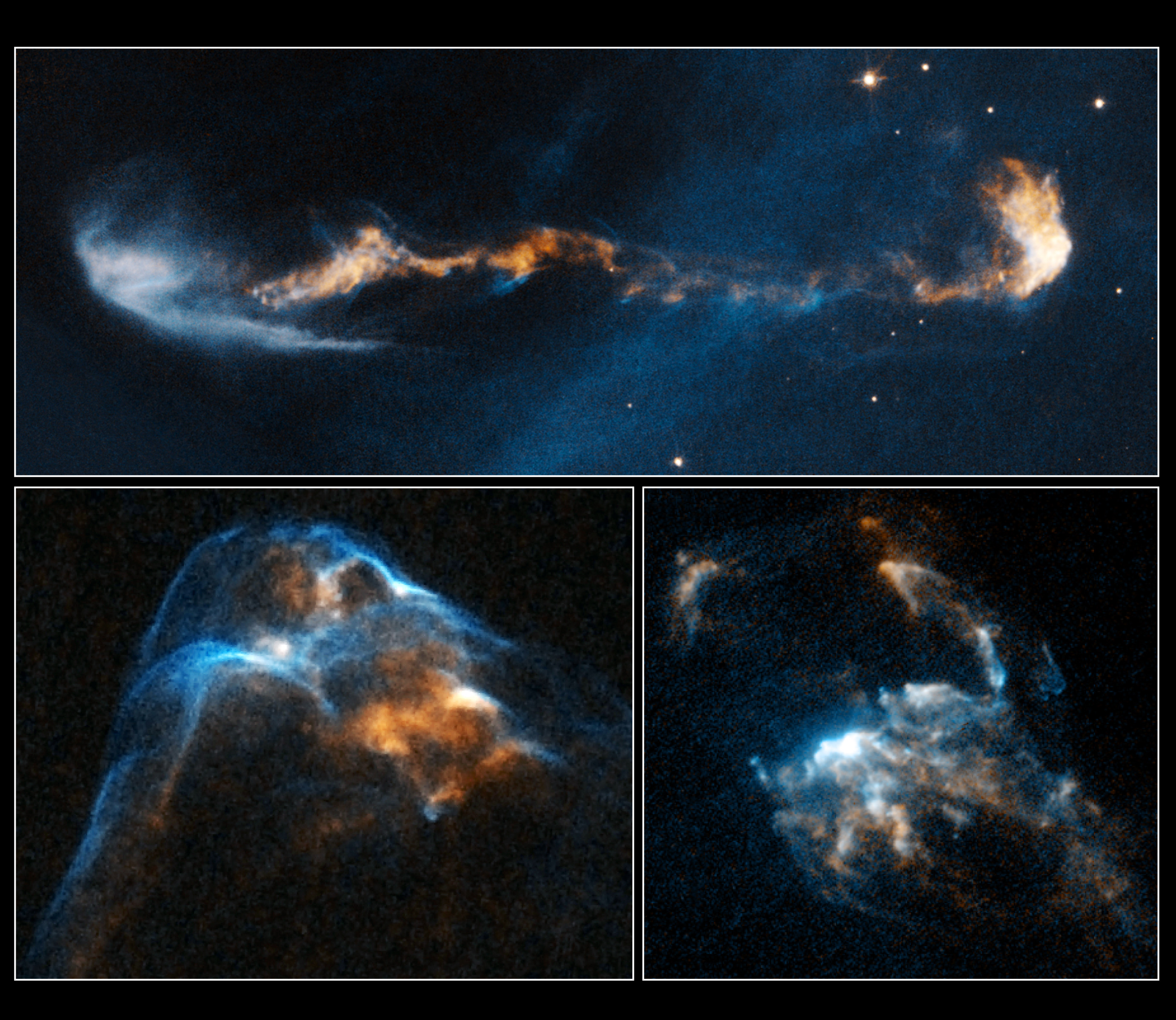
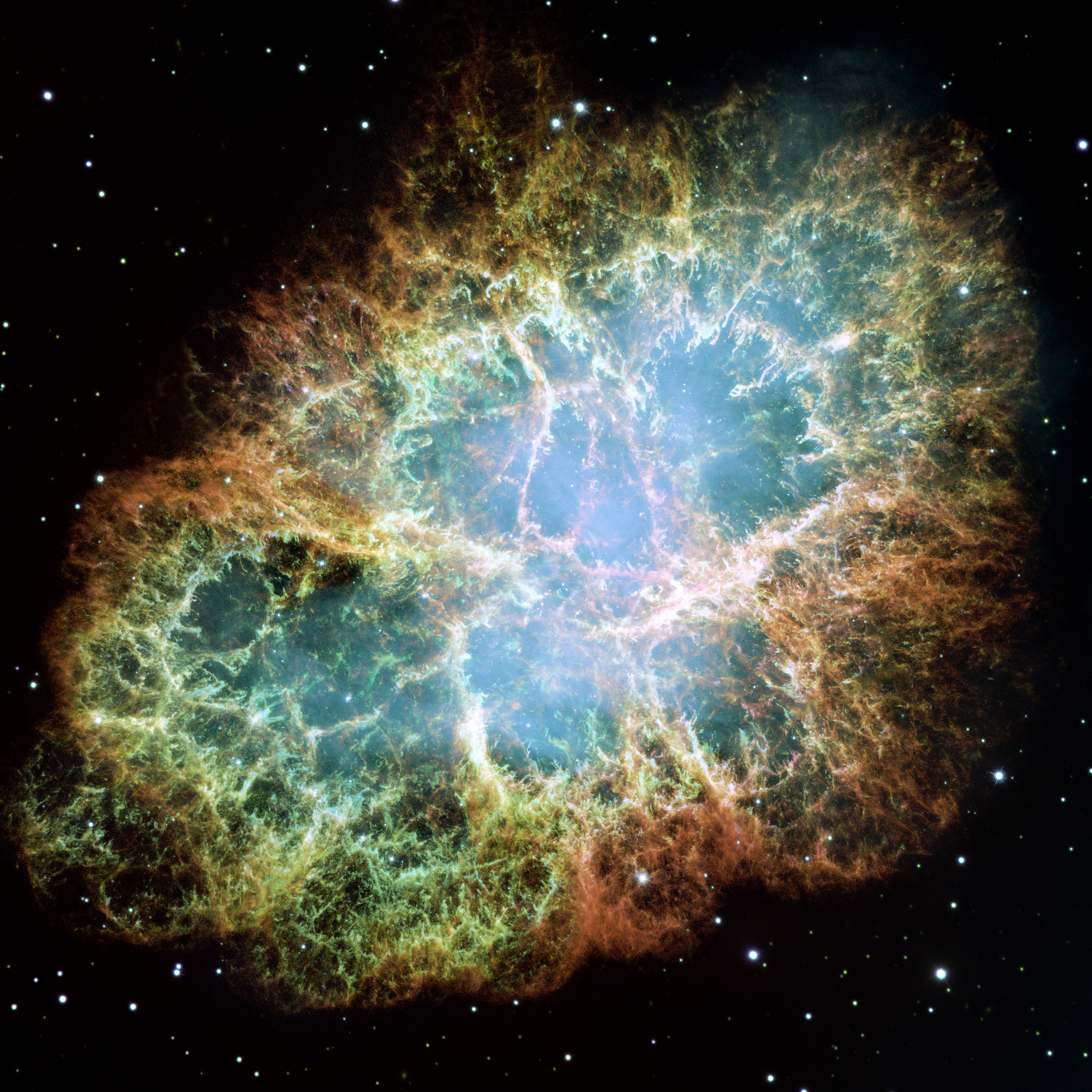
Examples of shock waves found in astrophysics: Herbig-Haro object (left) and supernova remnants (right).

Shock waves are common in astrophysical environments.

Because of the low ambient density, most astronomical shocks are collisionless. This means that the shocks are not formed by two-body Coulomb collisions, since the mean free path for these collisions is too large, often exceeding the size of the system. Such shocks were first theorised by Frederic de Hoffmann and Edward Teller, who studied shock waves in magnetized fluids with infinite conductivity. The precise mechanism for energy dissipation and entropy generation at such shocks is still under investigation, but it is widely accepted that the general mechanism driving these shocks consists of wave particle interaction and plasma instabilities, that operate on the scale of plasma skin depth, which is typically much shorter than the mean free path.

It is known that collisionless shocks are associated with extremely high energy particles, although it has not been definitively established if the high energy photons observed are emitted by protons, electrons or both. The energetic particles are in general believed to be accelerated by the Fermi acceleration mechanism. It is usually agreed that shocks caused by supernova remnants expanding in the interstellar medium accelerate the cosmic rays measured above the Earth's atmosphere.

Shock waves in stellar environments, such as shocks inside a core collapse supernova explosion often become radiation mediated shocks. Such shocks are formed by photons colliding with the electrons of the matter, and the downstream of these shocks is dominated by radiation energy density rather than thermal energy of matter.

An important type of astrophysical shock is the relativistic shock, in which the shock velocity is a non-negligible fraction of the speed of light. These shocks are unique to astrophysical environments, and can be either collisionless or radiation mediated. Relativistic shocks are theoretically expected in gamma ray bursts, active galactic nucleus jets and in some types of supernovae.

== Examples ==
- Interplanetary shock waves due to solar flares and coronal mass ejections, and originally discovered via geomagnetic sudden commencements.
- The bow shocks formed around planets in stellar winds, and sometimes around stars themselves.
- Supernova remnants driving a shock through the interstellar medium (ISM).
- Shocks traveling through a massive star as it explodes in a core collapse supernova.
- Shocks in interstellar gas, caused by a collision between molecular clouds or by a gravitational collapse of a cloud.
- Accretion shocks at the edge of galaxy clusters.
