= Vector soliton =

Type of wave

In physical optics or wave optics, a vector soliton is a solitary wave with multiple components coupled together that maintains its shape during propagation. Ordinary solitons maintain their shape but have effectively only one (scalar) polarization component, while vector solitons have two distinct polarization components. Among all the types of solitons, optical vector solitons draw the most attention due to their wide range of applications, particularly in generating ultrafast pulses and light control technology. Optical vector solitons can be classified into temporal vector solitons and spatial vector solitons. During the propagation of both temporal solitons and spatial solitons, despite being in a medium with birefringence, the orthogonal polarizations can copropagate as one unit without splitting due to the strong cross-phase modulation and coherent energy exchange between the two polarizations of the vector soliton which may induce intensity differences between these two polarizations. Thus vector solitons are no longer linearly polarized but rather elliptically polarized.

== Definition ==
C.R. Menyuk first derived the nonlinear pulse propagation equation in a single-mode optical fiber (SMF) under weak birefringence. Then, Menyuk described vector solitons as two solitons (more accurately called solitary waves) with orthogonal polarizations which co-propagate together without dispersing their energy and while retaining their shapes. Because of nonlinear interaction among these two polarizations, despite the existence of birefringence between these two polarization modes, they could still adjust their group velocity and be trapped together.

Vector solitons can be spatial or temporal, and are formed by two orthogonally polarized components of a single optical field or two fields of different frequencies but the same polarization.

== History ==
In 1987 Menyuk first derived the nonlinear pulse propagation equation in SMF under weak birefringence. This seminal equation opened up the new field of "scalar" solitons to researchers. His equation concerns the nonlinear interaction (cross-phase modulation and coherent energy exchange) between the two orthogonal polarization components of the vector soliton. Researchers have obtained both analytical and numerical solutions of this equation under weak, moderate and even strong birefringence.

In 1988 Christodoulides and Joseph first theoretically predicted a novel form of phase-locked vector soliton in birefringent dispersive media, which is now known as a high-order phase-locked vector soliton in SMFs. It has two orthogonal polarization components with comparable intensity. Despite the existence of birefringence, these two polarizations could propagate with the same group velocity as they shift their central frequencies.

In 2000, Cundiff and Akhmediev found that these two polarizations could form not only a so-called group-velocity-locked vector soliton but also a polarization-locked vector soliton. They reported that the intensity ratio of these two polarizations can be about 0.25–1.00.

However, recently, another type of vector soliton, "induced vector soliton" has been observed. Such a vector soliton is novel in that the intensity difference between the two orthogonal polarizations is extremely large (20 dB). It seems that weak polarizations are ordinarily unable to form a component of a vector soliton. However, due to the cross-polarization modulation between strong and weak polarization components, a "weak soliton" could also be formed. It thus demonstrates that the soliton obtained is not a "scalar" soliton with a linear polarization mode, but rather a vector soliton with a large ellipticity. This expands the scope of the vector soliton so that the intensity ratio between the strong and weak components of the vector soliton is not limited to 0.25–1.0 but can now extend to 20 dB.

Based on the classic work by Christodoulides and Joseph, which concerns a high-order phase-locked vector soliton in SMFs, a stable high-order phase-locked vector soliton has recently been created in a fiber laser. It has the characteristic that not only are the two orthogonally polarized soliton components phase-locked, but also one of the components has a double-humped intensity profile.

The following pictures show that, when the fiber birefringence is taken into consideration, a single nonlinear Schrödinger equation (NLSE) fails to describe the soliton dynamics but instead two coupled NLSEs are required. Then, solitons with two polarization modes can be numerically obtained.

== FWM spectral sideband in vector soliton ==
A new pattern of spectral sidebands was first experimentally observed on the polarization-resolved soliton spectra of the polarization-locked vector solitons of fiber lasers. The new spectral sidebands are characterized by the fact that their positions on the soliton's spectrum vary with the strength of the linear cavity birefringence, and while one polarization component's sideband has a spectral peak, the orthogonal polarization component has a spectral dip, indicating the energy exchange between the two orthogonal polarization components of the vector solitons. Numeric simulations also confirmed that the formation of the new type of spectral sidebands was caused by the FWM between the two polarization components.

== Bound vector soliton ==
Two adjacent vector solitons could form a bound state. Compared with scalar bound solitons, the polarization state of this soliton is more complex. Because of the cross interactions, the bound vector solitons could have much stronger interaction forces than can exist between scalar solitons.

== Vector dark soliton ==
Dark solitons are characterized by being formed from a localized reduction of intensity compared to a more intense continuous wave background. Scalar dark solitons (linearly polarized dark solitons) can be formed in all normal dispersion fiber lasers mode-locked by the nonlinear polarization rotation method and can be rather stable. Vector dark solitons are much less stable due to the cross-interaction between the two polarization components. Therefore, it is interesting to investigate how the polarization state of these two polarization components evolves.

In 2009, the first dark soliton fiber laser has been successfully achieved in an all-normal dispersion erbium-doped fiber laser with a polarizer in cavity. Experimentally finding that apart from the bright pulse emission, under appropriate conditions the fiber laser could also emit single or multiple dark pulses. Based on numerical simulations we interpret the dark pulse formation in the laser as a result of dark soliton shaping.

== Vector dark bright soliton ==
A "bright soliton" is characterized as a localized intensity peak above a continuous wave (CW) background while a dark soliton is featured as a localized intensity dip below a continuous wave (CW) background. "Vector dark bright soliton" means that one polarization state is a bright soliton while the other polarization is a dark soliton. Vector dark bright solitons have been reported in incoherently coupled spatial DBVSs in a self-defocusing medium and matter-wave DBVS in two-species condensates with repulsive scattering interactions, but never verified in the field of optical fiber.

== Induced vector soliton ==
Using a birefringent cavity fiber laser, an induced vector soliton may be formed due to the cross-coupling between the two orthogonal polarization components. If a strong soliton is formed along one principal polarization axis, then a weak soliton will be induced along the orthogonal polarization axis. The intensity of the weak component in an induced vector soliton may be so weak that by itself it could not form a soliton in the SPM. The characteristics of this type of soliton have been modeled numerically and confirmed by experiment.

== Vector dissipative soliton ==
A vector dissipative soliton could be formed in a laser cavity with net positive dispersion, and its formation mechanism is a natural result of the mutual nonlinear interaction among the normal cavity dispersion, cavity fiber nonlinear Kerr effect, laser gain saturation and gain bandwidth filtering. For a conventional soliton, it is a balance between only the dispersion and nonlinearity. Differing from a conventional soliton, a Vector dissipative soliton is strongly frequency chirped. It is unknown whether or not a phase-locked gain-guided vector soliton could be formed in a fiber laser: either the polarization-rotating or the phase-locked dissipative vector soliton can be formed in a fiber laser with large net normal cavity group velocity dispersion. In addition, multiple vector dissipative solitons with identical soliton parameters and harmonic mode-locking to the conventional dissipative vector soliton can also be formed in a passively mode-locked fiber laser with a SESAM.

=== Multiwavelength dissipative soliton ===
Recently, multiwavelength dissipative soliton in an all normal dispersion fiber laser passively mode-locked with a SESAM has been generated. It is found that depending on the cavity birefringence, stable single-, dual- and triple-wavelength dissipative soliton can be formed in the laser. Its generation mechanism can be traced back to the nature of dissipative soliton.

== Polarization rotation of vector soliton ==
In scalar solitons, the output polarization is always linear due to the existence of an in-cavity polarizer. But for vector solitons, the polarization state can be rotating arbitrarily but still locked to the cavity round-trip time or an integer multiple thereof.

== Higher-order vector soliton ==
In higher-order vector solitons, not only are the two orthogonally polarized soliton components phase-locked, but also one of the components has a double-humped intensity profile. Multiple such phase-locked high-order vector solitons with identical soliton parameters and harmonic mode-locking of the vector solitons have also been obtained in lasers. Numerical simulations confirmed the existence of stable high-order vector solitons in fiber lasers.

== Optical domain wall soliton ==
Recently, a phase-locked dark-dark vector soliton was only observed in fiber lasers of positive dispersion, a phase-locked dark-bright vector soliton was obtained in fiber lasers of either positive or negative dispersion. Numerical simulations confirmed the experimental observations, and further showed that the observed vector solitons are the two types of phase-locked polarization domain-wall solitons theoretically predicted.

== Vector soliton fiber laser with atomic layer graphene ==
Except the conventional semiconductor saturable absorber mirrors (SESAMs), which use III–V semiconductor multiple quantum wells grown on distributed Bragg reflectors (DBRs), many researchers have turned their attention onto other materials as saturable absorbers. Especially because there are a number of drawbacks associated with SESAMs. For example, SESAMs require complex and costly clean-room-based fabrication systems such as Metal-Organic Chemical Vapor Deposition (MOCVD) or Molecular Beam Epitaxy (MBE), and an additional substrate removal process is needed in some cases; high-energy heavy-ion implantation is required to introduce defect sites in order to reduce the device recovery time (typically a few nanoseconds) to the picosecond regime required for short-pulse laser mode-locking applications; since the SESAM is a reflective device, its use is restricted to only certain types of linear cavity topologies.

Other laser cavity topologies such as the ring-cavity design, which requires a transmission-mode device, which offers advantages such as doubling the repetition rate for a given cavity length, and which is less sensitive to reflection-induced instability with the use of optical isolators, is not possible unless an optical circulator is employed, which increases cavity loss and laser complexity; SESAMs also suffer from a low optical damage threshold. But there had been no alternative saturable absorbing materials to compete with SESAMs for the passive mode-locking of fiber lasers.

Recently, by the virtue of the saturable absorption properties in single wall carbon nanotubes (SWCNTs) in the near-infrared region with ultrafast saturation recovery times of ~1 picosecond, researchers have successfully produced a new type of effective saturable absorber quite different from SESAMs in structure and fabrication, and has, in fact, led to the demonstration of pico- or subpicosecond erbium-doped fiber (EDF) lasers. In these lasers, solid SWCNT saturable absorbers have been formed by direct deposition of SWCNT films onto flat glass substrates, mirror substrates, or end facets of optical fibers. However, the non-uniform chiral properties of SWNTs present inherent problems for precise control of the properties of the saturable absorber. Furthermore, the presence of bundled and entangled SWNTs, catalyst particles, and the formation of bubbles cause high nonsaturable losses in the cavity, despite the fact that the polymer host can circumvent some of these problems to some extent and afford ease of device integration. In addition, under large energy ultrashort pulses multi-photon effect induced oxidation occurs, which degrades the long term stability of the absorber.

Graphene is a single two-dimensional (2D) atomic layer of carbon atom arranged in a hexagonal lattice. Although as an isolated film it is a zero bandgap semiconductor, it is found that like the SWCNTs, graphene also possesses saturable absorption. In particular, as it has no bandgap, its saturable absorption is wavelength independent. It is potentially possible to use graphene or graphene-polymer composite to make a wideband saturable absorber for laser mode locking. Furthermore, comparing with the SWCNTs, as graphene has a 2D structure it should have much smaller non-saturable loss and much higher damage threshold. Indeed, with an erbium-doped fiber laser we self-started mode locking and stable soliton pulse emission with high energy have been achieved.

Due to the perfect isotropic absorption properties of graphene, the generated solitons could be regarded as vector solitons. How the evolution of vector soliton under the interaction of graphene was still unclear but interesting, particularly because it involved the mutual interaction of nonlinear optical wave with the atoms., which was highlighted in Nature Asia Materials and nanowerk.

Furthermore, atomic layer graphene possesses wavelength-insensitive ultrafast saturable absorption, which can be exploited as a "full-band" mode locker. With an erbium-doped dissipative soliton fiber laser mode locked with few layer graphene, it has been experimentally shown that dissipative solitons with continuous wavelength tuning as large as 30 nm (1570 nm-1600 nm) can be obtained.

== See also ==
- Soliton
- Fiber laser
- Nonlinear system
- Compacton, a soliton with compact support
- Clapotis
- Freak waves may be a related phenomenon
- Oscillon
- Peakon, a soliton with a non-differentiable peak
- Q-ball, a non-topological soliton
- Soliton (topological)
- Soliton (optics)
- Soliton model of nerve impulse propagation
- Spatial soliton
- Solitary waves in discrete media
- Topological quantum number
- Sine-Gordon equation
- Graphene
- Nonlinear Schrödinger equation
