= Action potential pulse =

An action potential pulse is a mathematically and experimentally correct Synchronized Oscillating Lipid Pulse coupled with an Action Potential. This is a continuation of Hodgkin Huxley's work in 1952 with the inclusion of accurately modelling ion channel proteins, including their dynamics and speed of activation.

The action potential pulse is a model of the speed an action potential that is dynamically dependent upon the position and number of ion channels, and the shape and make up of the axon. The action potential pulse model takes into account entropy and the conduction speed of the action potential along an axon. It is an addition to the Hodgkin Huxley model.

Investigation into the membranes of axons have shown that the spaces in between the channels are sufficiently large, such that cable theory cannot apply to them, because it depends upon the capacitance potential of a membrane to be transferred almost instantly to other areas of the membrane surface. In electrical circuits this can happen because of the special properties of electrons, which are negatively charged, whereas in membrane biophysics potential is defined by positively charged ions instead. These ions are usually Na^{1+} or Ca^{2+}, which move slowly by diffusion and have limited ionic radii in which they can affect adjacent ion channels. It is mathematically impossible for these positive ions to move from one channel to the next, in the time required by the action potential flow model, due to instigated depolarization. Furthermore entropy measurements have long demonstrated that an action potential's flow starts with a large increase in entropy followed by a steadily decreasing state, which does not match the Hodgkin Huxley theory. In addition a soliton pulse is known to flow at the same rate and follow the action potential. From measurements of the speed of an action potential, hyperpolarization must have a further component of which the 'soliton' mechanical pulse is the only candidate.

The resulting action potential pulse therefore is a synchronized, coupled pulse with the entropy from depolarization at one channel providing sufficient entropy for a pulse to travel to sequential channels and mechanically open them.

This mechanism explains the speed of transmission through both myelinated and unmyelinated axons.

This is a timed pulse, that combines the entropy from ion transport with the efficiency of a flowing pulse.

The action potential pulse model has many advantages over the simpler Hodgkin Huxley version including evidence, efficiency, timing entropy measurements, and the explanation of nerve impulse flow through myelinated axons.

Myelinated axons

This model replaces saltatory conduction, which was a historical theory that relied upon cable theory to explain conduction, and was an attempt at a model that has no basis is either physiology or membrane biophysics.

In myelinated axons the myelin acts as a mechanical transducer preserving the entropy of the pulse and insulating against mechanical loss. In this model the nodes of Ranvier (where ion channels are highly concentrated) concentrate the ion channels providing maximum entropy to instigate a pulse that travels from node to node along the axon with the entropy being preserved by the shape and dynamics of the myelin sheath.
