= Solitary wave =

In mathematics and physics, a solitary wave can refer to

- The solitary wave (water waves) or wave of translation, as observed by John Scott Russell in 1834, the prototype for a soliton.
- A soliton, a generalization of the wave of translation to general systems of partial differential equations
- A topological defect, a generalization of the idea of a soliton to any system which is stable against decay due to homotopy theory

== See also ==
- Rogue wave
