= Rosenau–Hyman equation =

The Rosenau–Hyman equation or K(n,n) equation is a KdV-like equation having compacton solutions. This nonlinear partial differential equation is of the form

$$u_t+a(u^n)_x+(u^n)_{xxx}=0. \,$$

The equation is named after Philip Rosenau and James M. Hyman, who used it in their 1993 study of compactons.

The K(n,n) equation has the following traveling wave solutions:

- when a > 0

$$u(x,t)= \left( \frac{2cn}{a(n+1)} \sin^2 \left(\frac{n-1}{2n}\sqrt{a}(x-ct+b)\right)\right)^{1/(n-1)},$$

- when a < 0

$$u(x,t)=\left( \frac{2cn}{a(n+1)}\sinh^2\left(\frac{n-1}{2n}\sqrt{-a}(x-ct+b)\right)\right)^{1/(n-1)},$$

$$u(x,t)= \left( \frac{2cn}{a(n+1)} \cosh^2 \left(\frac{n-1}{2n}\sqrt{-a}(x-ct+b)\right)\right)^{1/(n-1)}.$$
