= Scott Russell Aqueduct =

Aqueduct in Edinburgh, Scotland

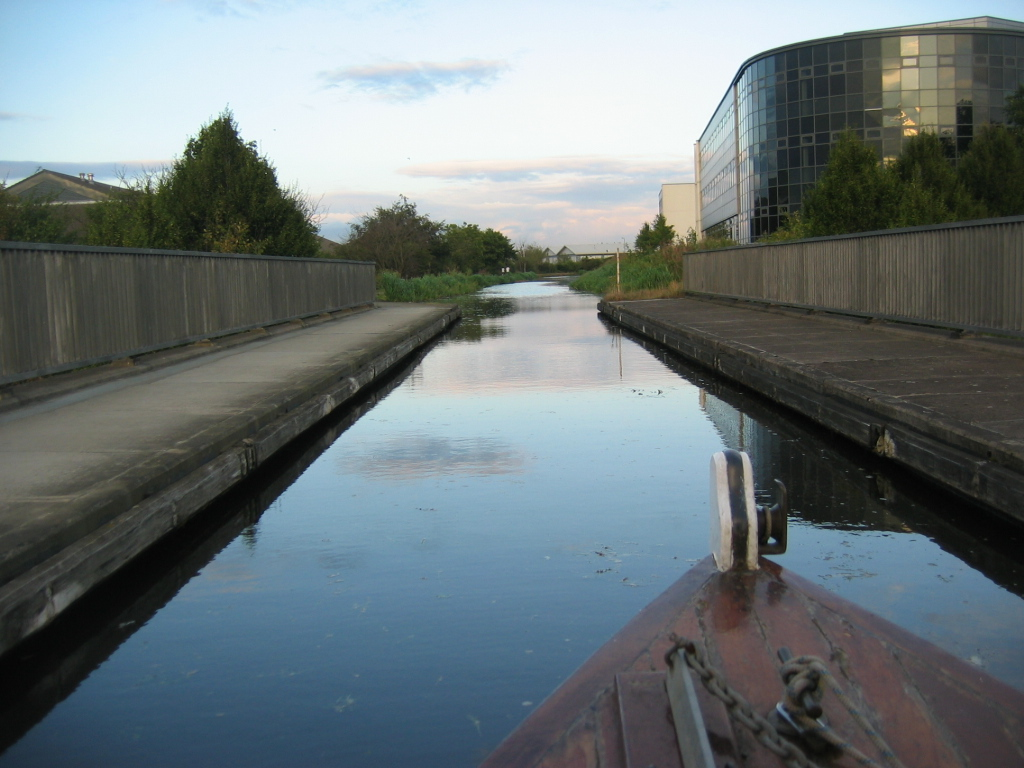
- Scott Russell Aqueduct
- Coordinates: 55.9218°N 3.3070°W
- OS grid reference: NT184706
- Carries: Union Canal
- Crosses: A720
- Locale: Edinburgh

Characteristics
- Total length: 330 feet (100.6 m)
- Width: 12.8 feet (3.9 m)

Location
- Interactive map of Scott Russell Aqueduct

The Scott Russell Aqueduct is an aqueduct carrying the Union Canal over the Edinburgh City Bypass, west of Edinburgh, Scotland.

== History ==
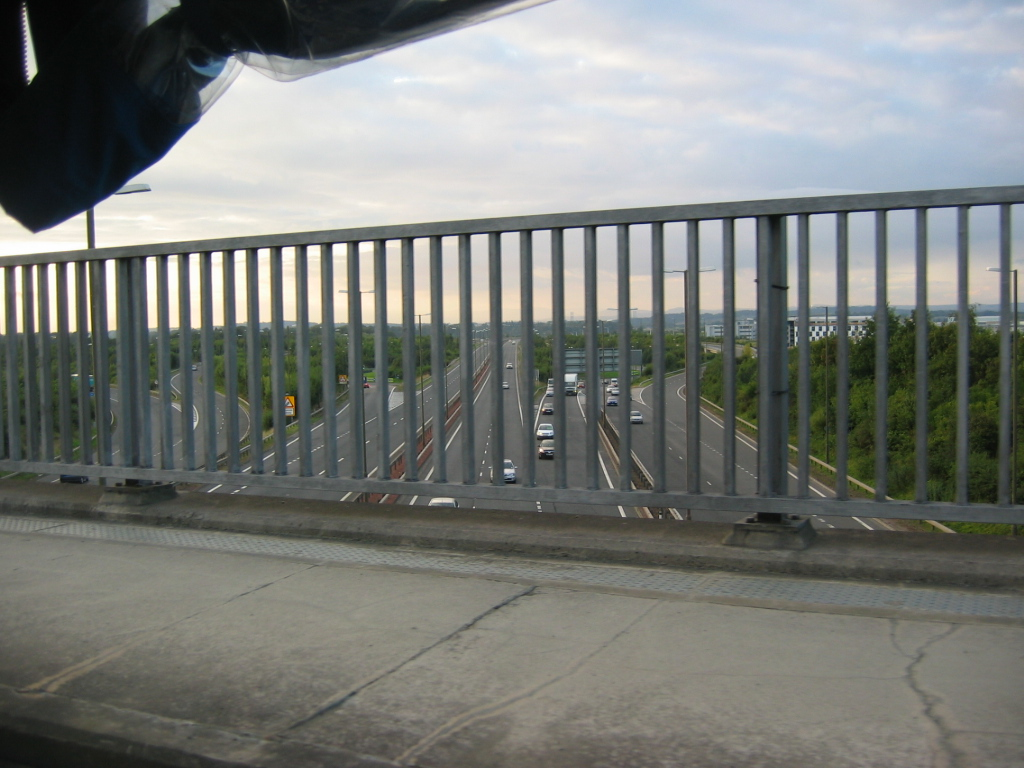
Looking down on the Edinburgh City bypass

The aqueduct was opened in May 1986 to carry the canal over the new Edinburgh City Bypass. This required a great deal of faith in the future of the canal, which culminated with the Millennium Link project when the Union Canal was connected with the Forth and Clyde Canal to form a coast to coast link. One proposal had been to not build an aqueduct to carry the canal across the new road, but instead build a marina to the west of the bypass.

It was named after the Scottish naval engineer John Scott Russell in a ceremony on 12 July 1995, who had discovered the soliton or solitary wave near Bridge 11 on the Union Canal in 1834. Russell had observed a bow wave continue to travel forward at a speed of 8 or 9 miles per hour (13 or 14 km/h) when a boat stopped moving, and called it the "wave of translation."

== Design ==
The aqueduct is the width of a single canal boat, and crosses the Bypass at a slight angle. It has five spans supported on three piers.

== See also ==
- List of bridges in Scotland
