= Philip Rosenau =

- פיליפ רוזנאו
- Born: 1946 (age 79–80); Poland
- Known for: Compactons; Rosenau–Hyman equation
- Scientific career
- Fields: Mathematics
- Workplaces: Tel Aviv University

Philip Rosenau (Hebrew: פיליפ רוזנאו; born 1946), is an Israeli mathematician and a poet. He is a professor at the Department of Applied Mathematics at Tel Aviv University. He introduced compactons, along with James M. Hyman.
