= Soliton model in neuroscience =

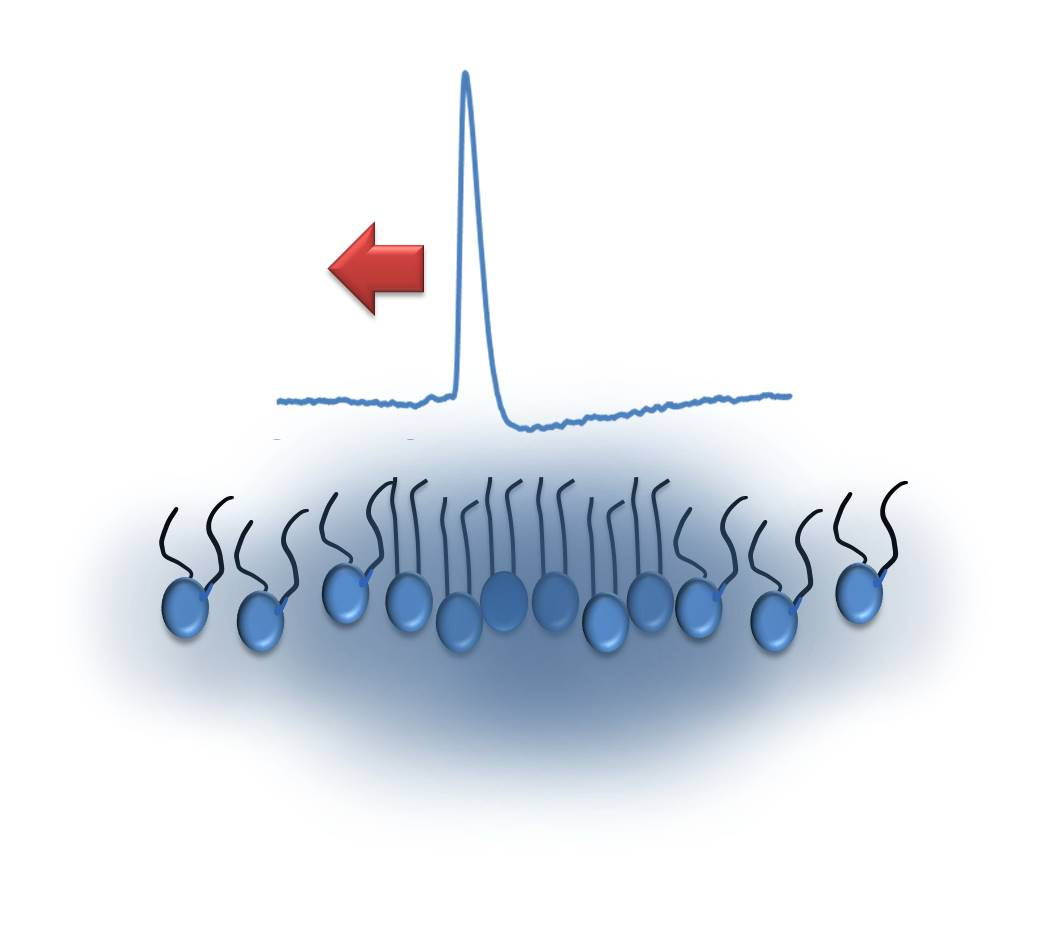
Nonlinear electro-mechanical wave measured in an artificial lipid system

The soliton hypothesis in neuroscience is a model that claims to explain how action potentials are initiated and conducted along axons based on a thermodynamic theory of nerve pulse propagation. It proposes that the signals travel along the cell's membrane in the form of certain kinds of solitary sound (or density) pulses that can be modeled as solitons. The model is proposed as an alternative to the Hodgkin–Huxley model in which action potentials: voltage-gated ion channels in the membrane open and allow sodium ions to enter the cell (inward current). The resulting decrease in membrane potential opens nearby voltage-gated sodium channels, thus propagating the action potential. The transmembrane potential is restored by delayed opening of potassium channels. Soliton hypothesis proponents assert that energy is mainly conserved during propagation except dissipation losses; Measured temperature changes are completely inconsistent with the Hodgkin-Huxley model.

The soliton model (and sound waves in general) depends on adiabatic propagation in which the energy provided at the source of excitation is carried adiabatically through the medium, i.e. plasma membrane. The measurement of a temperature pulse and the claimed absence of heat release during an action potential were the basis of the proposal that nerve impulses are an adiabatic phenomenon much like sound waves. Synaptically evoked action potentials in the electric organ of the electric eel are associated with substantial positive (only) heat production followed by active cooling to ambient temperature. In the garfish olfactory nerve, the action potential is associated with a biphasic temperature change; however, there is a net production of heat. These published results are inconsistent with the Hodgkin-Huxley Model and the authors interpret their work in terms of that model: The initial sodium current releases heat as the membrane capacitance is discharged; heat is absorbed during recharge of the membrane capacitance as potassium ions move with their concentration gradient but against the membrane potential. This mechanism is called the "Condenser Theory". Additional heat may be generated by membrane configuration changes driven by the changes in membrane potential. An increase in entropy during depolarization would release heat; entropy increase during repolarization would absorb heat. However, any such entropic contributions are incompatible with Hodgkin and Huxley model

== History ==
Ichiji Tasaki pioneered a thermodynamic approach to the phenomenon of nerve pulse propagation which identified several phenomena that were not included in the Hodgkin–Huxley model. Along with measuring various non-electrical components of a nerve impulse, Tasaki investigated the physical chemistry of phase transitions in nerve fibers and its importance for nerve pulse propagation. Based on Tasaki's work, Konrad Kaufman proposed sound waves as a physical basis for nerve pulse propagation in an unpublished manuscript. The basic idea at the core of the soliton model is the balancing of intrinsic dispersion of the two dimensional sound waves in the membrane by nonlinear elastic properties near a phase transition. The initial impulse can acquire a stable shape under such circumstances, in general known as a solitary wave. Solitons are the simplest solution of the set of nonlinear wave equations governing such phenomenon and were applied to model nerve impulse in 2005 by Thomas Heimburg and Andrew D. Jackson, both at the Niels Bohr Institute of the University of Copenhagen. Heimburg heads the institute's Membrane Biophysics Group. The biological physics group of Matthias Schneider has studied propagation of two-dimensional sound waves in lipid interfaces and their possible role in biological signalling

== Justification ==
The model starts with the observation that cell membranes always have a freezing point (the temperature below which the consistency changes from fluid to gel-like) only slightly below the organism's body temperature, and this allows for the propagation of solitons. An action potential traveling along a mixed nerve results in a slight increase in temperature followed by a decrease in temperature. Soliton model proponents claim that no net heat is released during the overall pulse and that the observed temperature changes are inconsistent with the Hodgkin-Huxley model. However, this is untrue: the Hodgkin Huxley model predicts a biphasic release and absorption of heat. In addition, the action potential causes a slight local thickening of the membrane and a force acting outwards; this effect is not predicted by the Hodgkin–Huxley model but does not contradict it, either.

The soliton model attempts to explain the electrical currents associated with the action potential as follows: the traveling soliton locally changes density and thickness of the membrane, and since the membrane contains many charged and polar substances, this will result in an electrical effect, akin to piezoelectricity. Indeed, such nonlinear sound waves have now been shown to exist at lipid interfaces that show superficial similarity to action potentials (electro-opto-mechanical coupling, velocities, biphasic pulse shape, threshold for excitation etc.). Furthermore, the waves remain localized in the membrane and do not spread out in the surrounding due to an impedance mismatch.

== Formalism ==
The soliton representing the action potential of nerves is the solution of the partial differential equation

$$\frac{\partial^2 \Delta \rho}{\partial t^2} = \frac{\partial}{\partial x} \left[\left(c_0^2 + p\Delta \rho + q\Delta \rho^2\right)\frac{\partial \Delta \rho}{\partial x}\right] - h\frac{\partial^4 \Delta\rho}{\partial x^4},$$

where t is time and x is the position along the nerve axon. Δρ is the change in membrane density under the influence of the action potential, c_{0} is the sound velocity of the nerve membrane, p and q describe the nature of the phase transition and thereby the nonlinearity of the elastic constants of the nerve membrane. The parameters c_{0}, p and q are dictated by the thermodynamic properties of the nerve membrane and cannot be adjusted freely. They have to be determined experimentally. The parameter h describes the frequency dependence of the sound velocity of the membrane (dispersion relation). The above equation does not contain any fit parameters. It is formally related to the Boussinesq approximation for solitons in water canals. The solutions of the above equation possess a limiting maximum amplitude and a minimum propagation velocity that is similar to the pulse velocity in myelinated nerves. Under restrictive assumptions, there exist periodic solutions that display hyperpolarization and refractory periods.

== Role of ion channels ==
Advocates of the soliton model claim that it explains several aspects of the action potential, which are not explained by the Hodgkin–Huxley model. Since it is of thermodynamic nature it does not address the properties of single macromolecules like ion channel proteins on a molecular scale. It is rather assumed that their properties are implicitly contained in the macroscopic thermodynamic properties of the nerve membranes. The soliton model predicts membrane current fluctuations during the action potential. These currents are of similar appearance as those reported for ion channel proteins. They are thought to be caused by lipid membrane pores spontaneously generated by the thermal fluctuations. Such thermal fluctuations explain the specific ionic selectivity or the specific time-course of the response to voltage changes on the basis of their effect on the macroscopic susceptibilities of the system.

== Application to anesthesia ==
The authors claim that their model explains the previously obscure mode of action of numerous anesthetics. The Meyer–Overton observation holds that the strength of a wide variety of chemically diverse anesthetics is proportional to their lipid solubility, suggesting that they do not act by binding to specific proteins such as ion channels but instead by dissolving in and changing the properties of the lipid membrane. Dissolving substances in the membrane lowers the membrane's freezing point, and the resulting larger difference between body temperature and freezing point inhibits the propagation of solitons. By increasing pressure, lowering pH or lowering temperature, this difference can be restored back to normal, which should cancel the action of anesthetics: this is indeed observed. The amount of pressure needed to cancel the action of an anesthetic of a given lipid solubility can be computed from the soliton model and agrees reasonably well with experimental observations.

== Differences between model predictions and experimental observations ==
Collision of solitons

The following is a list of some of the disagreements between experimental observations and the "soliton model":

Antidromic invasion of soma from axon
An action potential initiated anywhere on an axon will travel in an antidromic (backward) direction to the neuron soma (cell body) without loss of amplitude and produce a full-amplitude action potential in the soma. As the membrane area of the soma is orders of magnitude larger than the area of the axon, conservation of energy requires that an adiabatic mechanical wave decrease in amplitude. Since the absence of heat production is one of the claimed justifications of the 'soliton model', this is particularly difficult to explain within that model.

Persistence of action potential over wide temperature range
An important assumption of the soliton model is the presence of a phase transition near the ambient temperature of the axon ("Formalism", above). Then, rapid change of temperature away from the phase transition temperature would necessarily cause large changes in the action potential. Below the phase transition temperature, the soliton wave would not be possible. Yet, action potentials are present at 0 °C. The time course is slowed in a manner predicted by the measured opening and closing kinetics of the Hodgkin-Huxley ion channels.
Collisions
Nerve impulses traveling in opposite directions annihilate each other on collision. On the other hand, mechanical waves do not annihilate but pass through each other. Soliton model proponents have attempted to show that action potentials can pass through a collision; however, collision annihilation of orthodromic and antidromic action potentials is a routinely observed phenomenon in neuroscience laboratories and are the basis of a standard technique for identification of neurons. Solitons pass each other on collision (Figure--"Collision of Solitons"), solitary waves in general can pass, annihilate or bounce of each other and solitons are only a special case of such solitary waves.

Ionic currents under voltage clamp
The voltage clamp, used by Hodgkin and Huxley (1952) (Hodgkin-Huxley Model) to experimentally dissect the action potential in the squid giant axon, uses electronic feedback to measure the current necessary to hold membrane voltage constant at a commanded value. A silver wire, inserted into the interior of the axon, forces a constant membrane voltage along the length of the axon. Under these circumstances, there is no possibility of a traveling 'soliton'. Any thermodynamic changes are very different from those resulting from an action potential. Yet, the measured currents accurately reproduce the action potential.

Single channel currents
The patch clamp technique isolates a microscopic patch of membrane on the tip of a glass pipette. It is then possible to record currents from single ionic channels. There is no possibility of propagating solitons or thermodynamic changes. Yet, the properties of these channels (temporal response to voltage jumps, ionic selectivity) accurately predict the properties of the macroscopic currents measured under conventional voltage clamp.

Selective ionic conductivity
The current underlying the action potential depolarization is selective for sodium. Repolarization depends on a selective potassium current. These currents have very specific responses to voltage changes which quantitatively explain the action potential. Substitution of non-permeable ions for sodium abolishes the action potential. The 'soliton model' cannot explain either the ionic selectivity or the responses to voltage changes.

Pharmacology
The drug tetrodotoxin (TTX) blocks action potentials at extremely low concentrations. The site of action of TTX on the sodium channel has been identified. Dendrotoxins block the potassium channels. These drugs produce quantitatively predictable changes in the action potential. The 'soliton model' provides no explanation for these pharmacological effects.

== Action waves ==
A recent theoretical model, proposed by Ahmed El Hady and Benjamin Machta, proposes that there is a mechanical surface wave which co-propagates with the electrical action potential. These surface waves are called "action waves". In the El Hady–Machta's model, these co-propagating waves are driven by voltage changes across the membrane caused by the action potential.

== See also ==
- Biological neuron models
- Hodgkin–Huxley model
- Vector soliton

== Sources ==
- Federico Faraci (2013) "The 60th anniversary of the Hodgkin-Huxley model: a critical assessment from a historical and modeler's viewpoint"
- Revathi Appali, Ursula van Rienen, Thomas Heimburg (2012) "A comparison of the Hodgkin-Huxley model and the Soliton theory for the Action Potential in Nerves "
- Action Waves in the Brain, The Guardian, 1 May 2015.
- Ichiji Tasaki (1982) "Physiology and Electrochemistry of Nerve Fibers"
- Konrad Kaufman (1989) "Action Potentials and Electrochemical Coupling in the Macroscopic Chiral Phospholipid Membrane".
- Andersen, Jackson and Heimburg"Towards a thermodynamic theory of nerve pulse propagation"
- Pradip Das; W.H. Schwarz (4 November 1994). "Solitons in cell membrane". Physical Review E. 51 (4): 3588–3612. Bibcode:1995PhRvE..51.3588D. doi:10.1103/PhysRevE.51.3588. PMID 9963042.
- Revisiting the mechanics of the action potential, Princeton University Journal watch, 1 April 2015.
- On the (sound) track of anesthetics, Eurekalert, according to a press release University of Copenhagen, 6 March 2007
- Kaare Græsbøll (2006). "Function of Nerves — Action of Anesthetics" (PDF). Gamma. 143. Archived from the original (PDF) on 2016-03-03. An elementary introduction.
- Solitary acoustic waves observed to propagate at a lipid membrane interface, Phys.org June 20, 2014
