= Light bullet =

Light bullets are localized pulses of electromagnetic energy that can travel through a medium and retain their spatiotemporal shape in spite of diffraction and dispersion which tend to spread the pulse. This is made possible by a balance between the non-linear self-focusing and spreading effects brought about by the medium in which the pulse beam propagates.

== Prediction and discovery ==
Light bullets were predicted and so termed by Yaron Silberberg in 1990, and demonstrated the following decade.

== Comparison with solitons ==
Spatial and temporal stability which are the characteristics of a soliton have been achieved in light bullets using alternative refractive index models. An experiment which exploited the discrete spreading and self-focusing effects on 170-femtosecond pulses at 1550-nanometre wavelengths by a two-dimensional hexagonal array of silica waveguides reported a spatial profiles stationary for about twice as far as it would be in linear propagation and temporal profile about nine times stationary as that of the corresponding linear propagation.

Light bullets lose energy in the process of a collision. This behavior is different from that of solitons which survive collisions without losing energy

== Possible applications ==
- Artificially-induced lightning
- Monitoring air pollution

== See also ==
- Laser-induced breakdown spectroscopy (LIBS)
