= Compacton =

In the theory of integrable systems, a compacton (introduced in (Philip Rosenau & James M. Hyman 1993)) is a soliton with compact support.

An example of an equation with compacton solutions is the generalization

$$u_t+(u^m)_x+(u^n)_{xxx}=0\,$$

of the Korteweg–de Vries equation (KdV equation) with m, n > 1. The case with m = n is the Rosenau–Hyman equation as used in their 1993 study; the case m = 2, n = 1 is essentially the KdV equation.

== Example ==
The equation

$$u_t+(u^2)_x+(u^2)_{xxx}=0 \,$$

has a travelling wave solution given by

$$u(x,t) = \begin{cases}
\dfrac{4\lambda}{3}\cos^2((x-\lambda t)/4) & \text{if }|x - \lambda t| \le 2\pi, \\  \\
0 & \text{if }|x - \lambda t| \ge 2\pi.
\end{cases}$$

This has compact support in x, and so is a compacton.

== See also ==
- Peakon
- Vector soliton
