= Giorgio Bidone =

Italian engineer and mathematician (1781–1839)

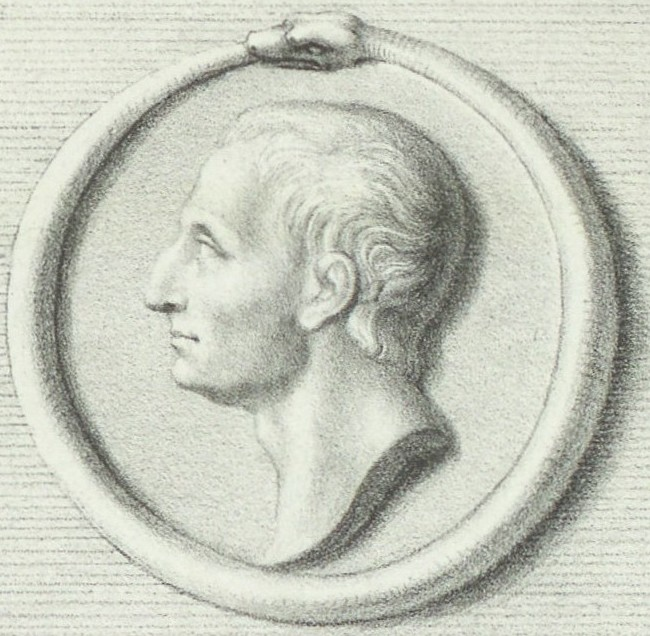
Portrait of Giorgio Bidone

Giovanni Giorgio Bidone (19 January 1781, Casalnoceto, Piedmont – 25 August 1839, Turin, Kingdom of Sardinia) was an Italian engineer, mathematician and an experimenter in the field of hydraulics.

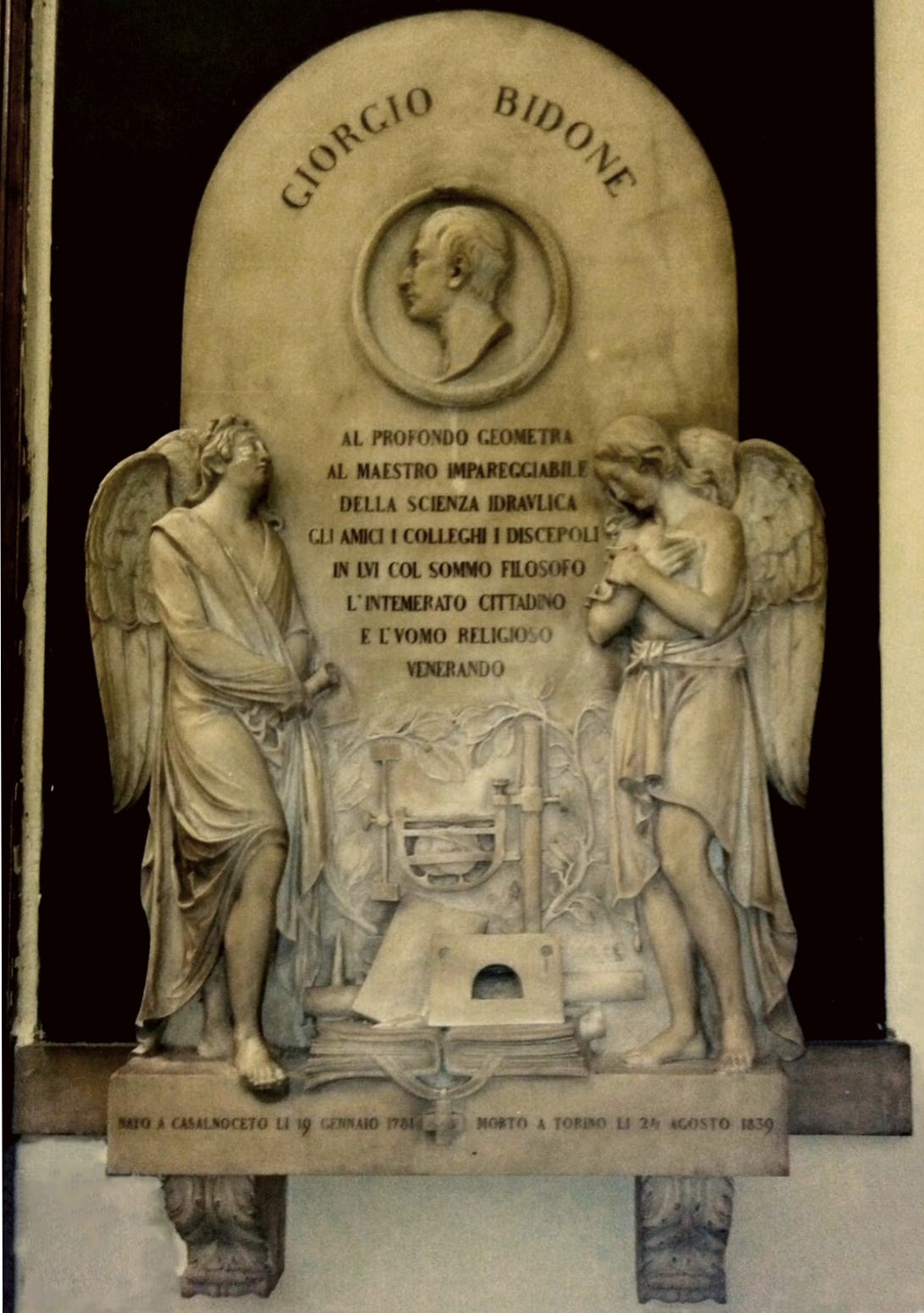
Bidone's cenotaph

== Biography ==
Giorgio Bidone's parents were Alessandro Antonio Bidone and Margherita Malaspina. In 1782, when Giorgio was one year old, the family moved to Voghera where he was educated.

He then entered the Filipino College in Turin. His plans to become a priest were abandoned because of new laws introduced by the French after Piedmont was annexed by Napoleon Bonaparte. He studied at Collegio delle Province as well as the University of Turin. He graduated in mathematics and hydraulic engineering at Turin at the age of 23 and two years later he graduated in civil engineering. He became a member of the Academy of Sciences of Turin in 1811 and was appointed professor of hydraulics in 1815. His research was in mathematics on the solution of transcendental equations and also on definite integrals.

He performed experiments in the field of hydraulics at a laboratory at Parella, which had been established in 1763 by Francesco Domenico Michelotti. His research focused on analysis and hydraulics. In 1820 he published a paper called Experiences sur le remou et sur la propagation des ondes, where he announced the hydrodynamic phenomenon known as the "hydraulic jump". This is how kinetic energy is dissipated when a fast flowing current reaches a slower current. This effect can be seen in both water and air.

In his hydraulic research he combined experiments with mathematical models. In his study of overflow he measured the upstream increase in height and the shape caused by an obstruction and then derived the equations for describing this effect.

In 1817, together with Ignazio Michelotti, who was supervisor of rivers and chief inspector of canals, he drafted the new laws concerning the waterways of the kingdom. This earned him the Civil Order of Merit of Savoy in 1839.

Between 1822 and 1823, he participated in an international collaboration to survey across the Alps to link his region with the rest of Western Europe and Eastern Europe.

In 1826, he gave the first known description of solitary waves, today called solitons.

Bidone also taught mathematics at the University of Turin and he was appointed professor of geometry. He became a member of the National Academy of Sciences of Italy.

== Works ==
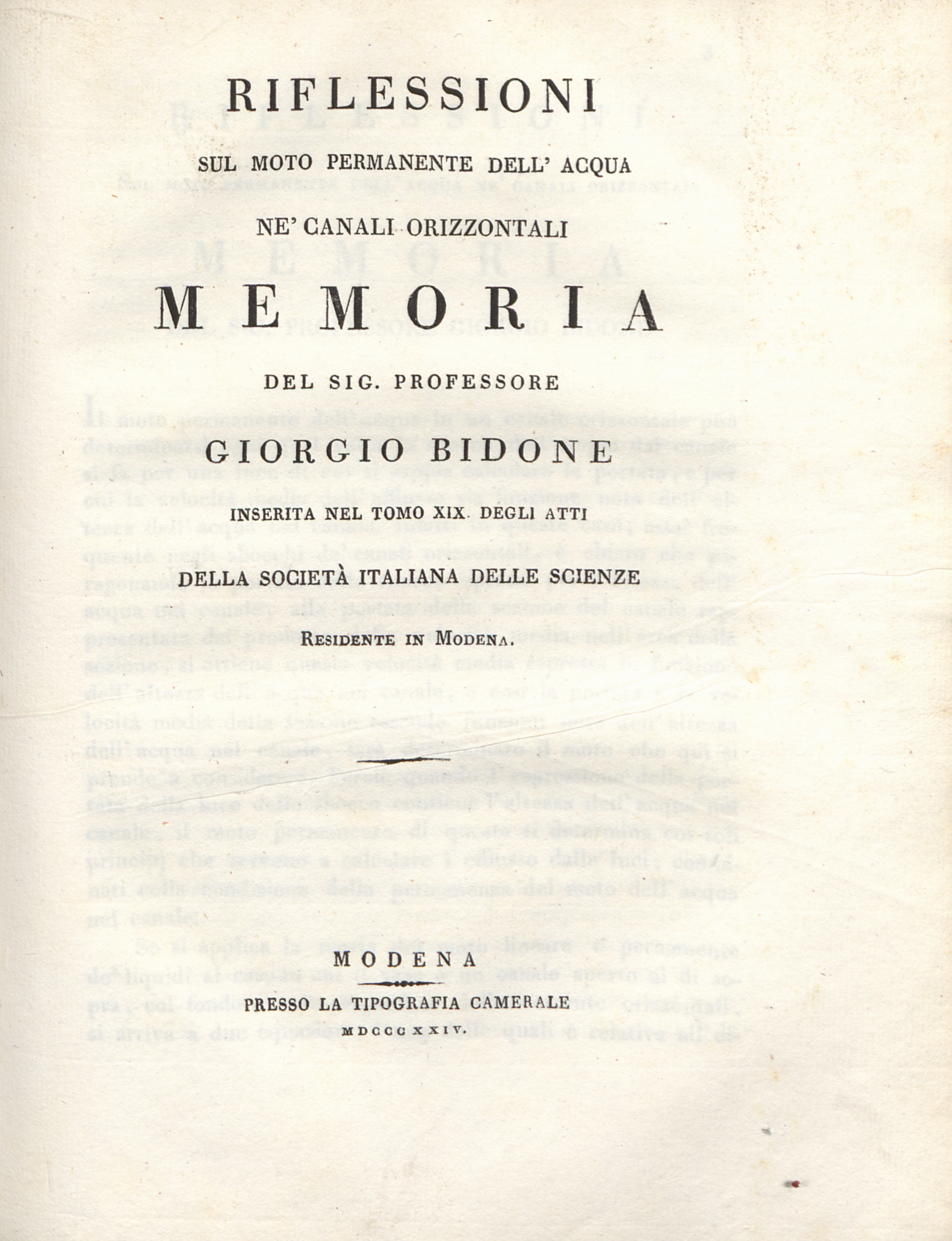
Riflessioni sul moto permanente dell'acqua, 1824

- Description d'une nouvelle boussole propre a observer les mouvemens de rotation et de translation de l'aiguille aimantée (in French). 1811.
- Mémoire sur la cause des ricochets que font les pierres et les boulets de canon, lancés obliquement sur la surface de l'eau (in French). Turin. 1811 – via de l'Imprimerie de l'Académie Imperiale des Sciences.
- Mémoire sur diverses intégrales définies (in French). Turin. 1812 – via chez Felix Galletti imprimeur de l'Academie Imperiale des Sciences.
- Mémoire sur les transcendantes elliptiques (in French). Vol. 1. Turin. 1817 – via de l'Imprimerie Royale.
  - Mémoire sur les transcendantes elliptiques (in French). Vol. 2.
- Expériences sur le remou et sur la propagation des ondes (in French). Turin. 1820 – via de l'Imprimerie Royale.
- Riflessioni sul moto permanente dell'acqua ne' canali orizzontali. Modena. 1824 – via presso la Tipografia camerale.
- Expériences sur la dépense des reversoirs et sur l'accélération et la courbure qu'ils occasionnent à la surface du courant (in French). Turin. 1824 – via Imprimerie Royale.
- Osservazioni sopra le macchine in moto. Torino. 1825 – via dalla Stamperia reale.
- Expériences sur la propagation du remous (in French). Turin. 1825 – via Imprimerie Royale.
- Expériences sur divers cas de la contraction de la veine fluide, et remarque sur la manière d'avoir égard à la contraction dans le calcul de la dépense des orifices (in French). Turin. c. 1825 – via de l'Imprimerie Royale.
- Esperienze sulle contrazioni parziali delle vene d'acqua. Modena. 1830 – via dalla Tipografia Camerale.
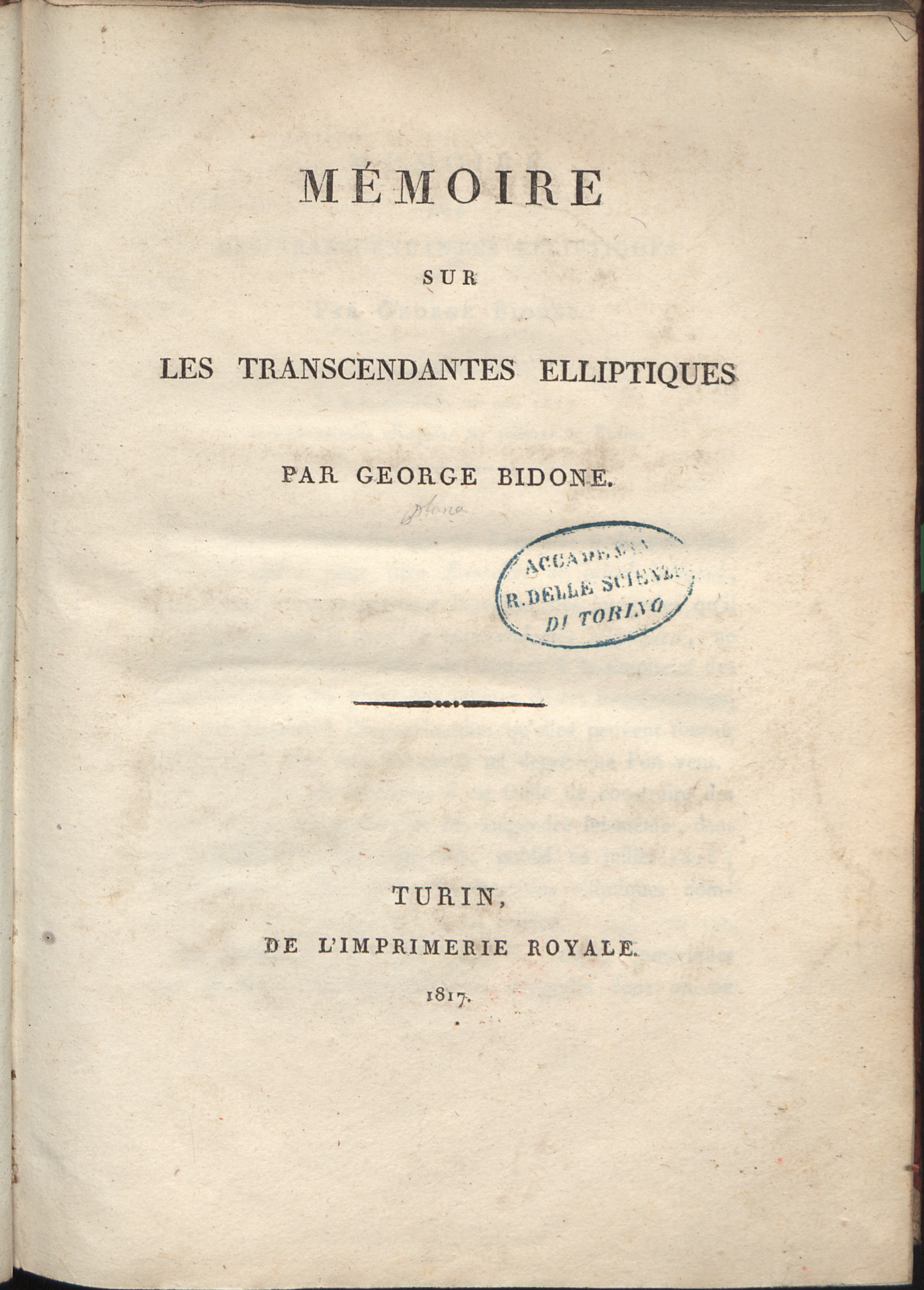
Mémoire sur les transcendantes elliptiques, 1817

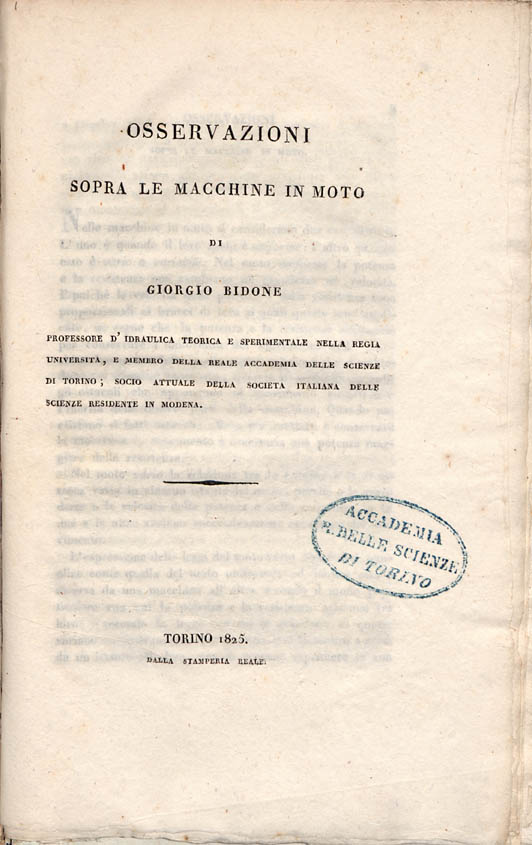
Osservazioni sopra le macchine in moto, 1825

== Bibliography ==
- O'Connor, John J.; Robertson, Edmund F., "Giovanni Giorgio Bidone", MacTutor History of Mathematics Archive, University of St Andrews
- "Idraulici Italiani" by Mario Di Fidio & Claudio Gandolfi
