= Ursula van Rienen =

German physicist

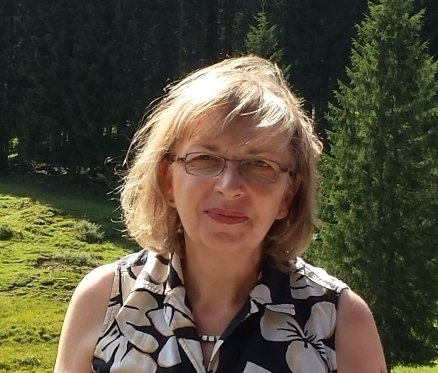
Van Rienen in 2016

Ursula van Rienen (born 1957) is a German applied mathematician and physicist whose research involves computational electrodynamics, the computational simulation of interactions between electromagnetic fields and biological tissue, and its applications in electrical brain stimulation. She is a university professor in the Institut für Allgemeine Elektrotechnik at the University of Rostock, where she holds the Chair of Electromagnetic Field Theory.

== Education and career ==
Van Rienen studied mathematics and physics at the University of Bonn, earning a vordiplom (the equivalent of a bachelor's degree) in 1979, and a diploma (the equivalent of a master's degree) in 1983, with a minor in operations research. She worked as a researcher at DESY, the German Electron Synchrotron research center, from 1983 to 1989. In 1989 she defended a doctoral thesis through the Technische Universität Darmstadt, titled Zur numerischen Berechnung zeitharmonischer elektromagntischer Felder in offenen, zylindersymetrischen Strukturen unter Verwendung von Mehrgitterverfahren [On the numerical calculation of time-harmonic electromagnetic fields in open, cylindrically symmetrical structures using multi-grid methods], supervised by Willi Törnig.

Beginning in 1990, she worked as a research assistant at the Technische Universität Darmstadt, and then a lecturer in 1995. In 1997 she completed a habilitation there, and in the same year took her current position as a professor at the University of Rostock.

At Rostock, she has been dean of the Faculty of Information Technology and Electrical Engineering from 2004 to 2006, and vice rector for research and research training from 2009 to 2013.

== Books ==
Van Rienen published her habilitation thesis as the book Numerical Methods in Computational Electrodynamics: Linear Systems in Practical Applications (Springer, 2001).
