= Soliton =

Self-reinforcing single wave packet

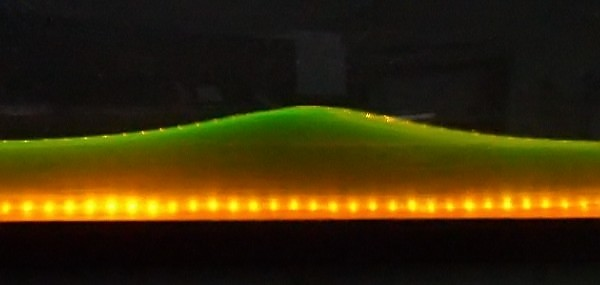
Solitary wave in a laboratory wave channel

In mathematics and physics, a soliton is a nonlinear, self-reinforcing, localized wave packet that is strongly stable, in that it preserves its shape while propagating freely, at constant velocity, and recovers it even after collisions with other such localized wave packets. Its remarkable stability can be traced to a balanced cancellation of nonlinear and dispersive effects in the medium. (Note: Dispersive effects are a property of certain systems where the speed of a wave depends on its frequency.) Solitons were subsequently found to provide stable solutions of a wide class of weakly nonlinear dispersive partial differential equations describing physical systems.

The soliton phenomenon was first described in 1826 by Giorgio Bidone, though this was largely overlooked by researchers in Britain. It was next described in 1834 by John Scott Russell who observed a solitary wave in the Union Canal in Scotland. He reproduced the phenomenon in a wave tank and named it the "Wave of Translation". The Korteweg–de Vries equation was later formulated to model such waves, and the term "soliton" was coined by Norman Zabusky and Martin David Kruskal to describe localized, strongly stable propagating solutions to this equation. The name was meant to characterize the solitary nature of the waves, with the "on" suffix recalling the usage for particles such as electrons, baryons and hadrons, reflecting their observed particle-like behaviour.

== Definition ==
A single, consensus definition of a soliton is difficult to find. Drazin & Johnson (1989, p. 15) ascribe three properties to solitons:

1. They are of permanent form;
2. They are localized within a region;
3. They can interact with other solitons, and emerge from the collision unchanged, except for a phase shift.

More formal definitions exist, but they require substantial mathematics. Moreover, some scientists use the term soliton for phenomena that do not quite have these three properties (for instance, the 'light bullets' of nonlinear optics are often called solitons despite losing energy during interaction).

== History ==
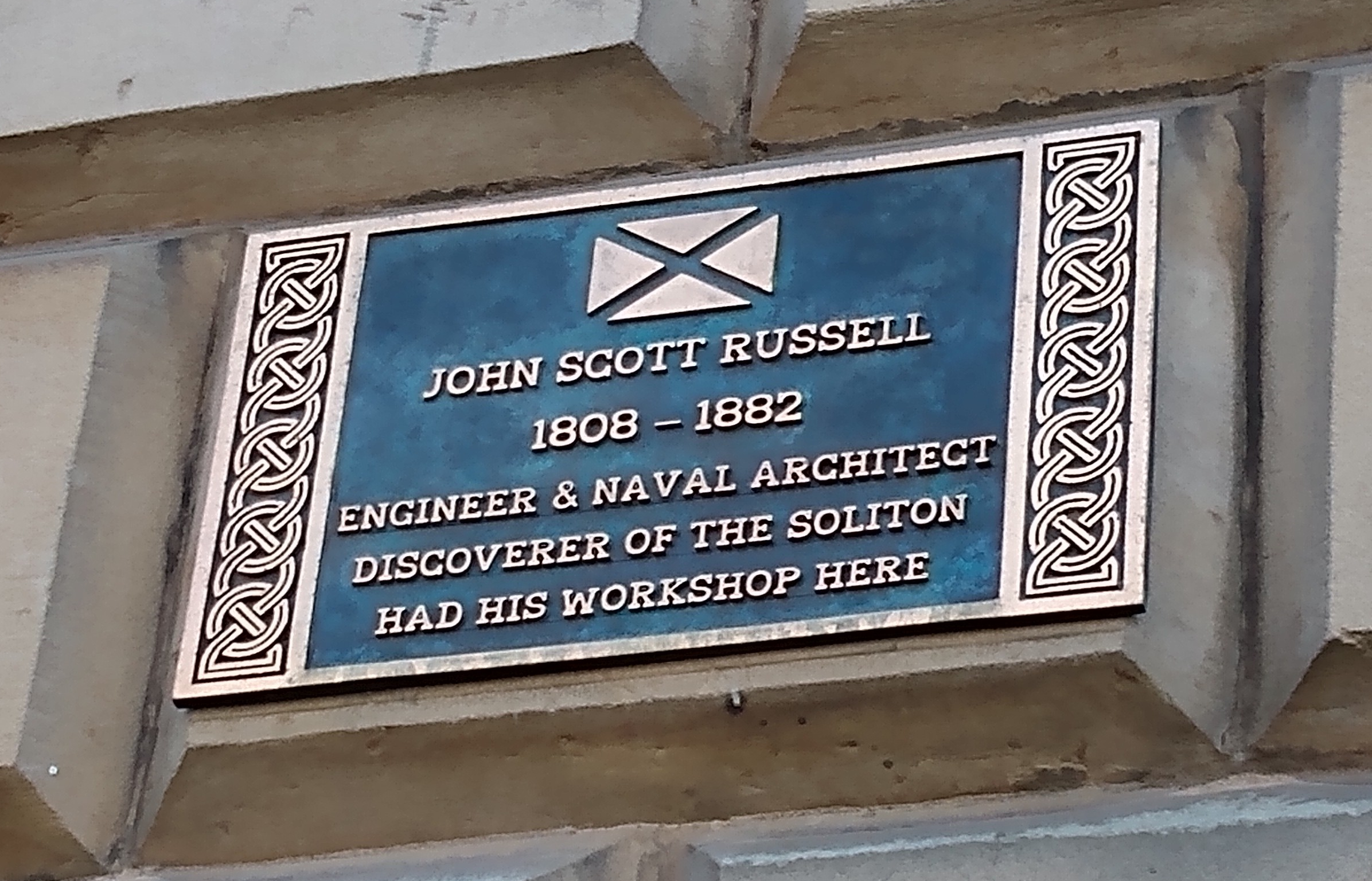
A plaque marking the workshop of John Scott Russell at 8 Stafford Street in Edinburgh

In 1826, Giorgio Bidone in Turin described solitary waves, but Bidone's work seems to have gone unnoticed by researchers in the Netherlands and Britain, despite being mentioned in the Edinburgh Journal of Science in the same year.

In 1834, John Scott Russell described his wave of translation: (Note: "Translation" here means that there is real mass transport, although it is not the same water which is transported from one end of the canal to the other end by this "Wave of Translation". Rather, a fluid parcel acquires momentum during the passage of the solitary wave, and comes to rest again after the passage of the wave. But the fluid parcel has been displaced substantially forward during the process – by Stokes drift in the wave propagation direction. And a net mass transport is the result. Usually there is little mass transport from one side to another side for ordinary waves.) (Note: This passage has been repeated in many papers and books on soliton theory.)

I was observing the motion of a boat which was rapidly drawn along a narrow channel by a pair of horses, when the boat suddenly stopped – not so the mass of water in the channel which it had put in motion; it accumulated round the prow of the vessel in a state of violent agitation, then suddenly leaving it behind, rolled forward with great velocity, assuming the form of a large solitary elevation, a rounded, smooth and well-defined heap of water, which continued its course along the channel apparently without change of form or diminution of speed. I followed it on horseback, and overtook it still rolling on at a rate of some eight or nine miles an hour, preserving its original figure some thirty feet long and a foot to a foot and a half in height. Its height gradually diminished, and after a chase of one or two miles I lost it in the windings of the channel. Such, in the month of August 1834, was my first chance interview with that singular and beautiful phenomenon which I have called the Wave of Translation.

Scott Russell spent some time making practical and theoretical investigations of these waves. He built wave tanks at his home and noticed some key properties:

- The waves are stable, and can travel over very large distances (normal waves would tend to either flatten out, or steepen and topple over)
- The speed depends on the size of the wave, and its width on the depth of water.
- Unlike normal waves they will never merge – so a small wave is overtaken by a large one, rather than the two combining.
- If a wave is too big for the depth of water, it splits into two, one big and one small.

Scott Russell's experimental work seemed at odds with Isaac Newton's and Daniel Bernoulli's theories of hydrodynamics. George Biddell Airy and George Gabriel Stokes had difficulty accepting Scott Russell's experimental observations because they could not be explained by the existing water wave theories. Additional observations were reported by Henry Bazin in 1862 after experiments carried out in the canal de Bourgogne in France. Their contemporaries spent some time attempting to extend the theory but it would take until the 1870s before Joseph Boussinesq and Lord Rayleigh published a theoretical treatment and solutions. (Note: Lord Rayleigh published a paper in Philosophical Magazine in 1876 to support John Scott Russell's experimental observation with his mathematical theory. In his 1876 paper, Lord Rayleigh mentioned Scott Russell's name and also admitted that the first theoretical treatment was by Joseph Valentin Boussinesq in 1871. Joseph Boussinesq mentioned Russell's name in his 1871 paper. Thus Scott Russell's observations on solitons were accepted as true by some prominent scientists within his own lifetime of 1808–1882.) In 1895 Diederik Korteweg and Gustav de Vries provided what is now known as the Korteweg–de Vries equation, including solitary wave and periodic cnoidal wave solutions. (Note: Korteweg and de Vries did not mention John Scott Russell's name at all in their 1895 paper but they did quote Boussinesq's paper of 1871 and Lord Rayleigh's paper of 1876. The paper by Korteweg and de Vries in 1895 was not the first theoretical treatment of this subject but it was a very important milestone in the history of the development of soliton theory.)

An animation of the overtaking of two solitary waves according to the Benjamin–Bona–Mahony equation – or BBM equation, a model equation for (among others) long surface gravity waves. The wave heights of the solitary waves are 1.2 and 0.6, respectively, and their velocities are 1.4 and 1.2. The upper graph is for a frame of reference moving with the average velocity of the solitary waves. The lower graph (with a different vertical scale and in a stationary frame of reference) shows the oscillatory tail produced by the interaction. Thus, the solitary wave solutions of the BBM equation are not solitons.

In 1965 Norman Zabusky of Bell Labs and Martin Kruskal of Princeton University first demonstrated soliton behavior in media subject to the Korteweg–de Vries equation (KdV equation) in a computational investigation using a finite difference approach. They also showed how this behavior explained the puzzling earlier work of Fermi, Pasta, Ulam, and Tsingou.

In 1967, Gardner, Greene, Kruskal and Miura discovered an inverse scattering transform enabling analytical solution of the KdV equation. The work of Peter Lax on Lax pairs and the Lax equation has since extended this to solution of many related soliton-generating systems.

Solitons are, by definition, unaltered in shape and speed by a collision with other solitons. So solitary waves on a water surface are near-solitons, but not exactly – after the interaction of two (colliding or overtaking) solitary waves, they have changed a bit in amplitude and an oscillatory residual is left behind.

Solitons are also studied in quantum mechanics, thanks to the fact that they could provide a new foundation of it through de Broglie's unfinished program, known as "Double solution theory" or "Nonlinear wave mechanics". This theory, developed by de Broglie in 1927 and revived in the 1950s, is the natural continuation of his ideas developed between 1923 and 1926, which extended the wave–particle duality introduced by Albert Einstein for the light quanta, to all the particles of matter. The observation of accelerating surface gravity water wave soliton using an external hydrodynamic linear potential was demonstrated in 2019. This experiment also demonstrated the ability to excite and measure the phases of ballistic solitons.

== Characteristics ==
A hyperbolic secant (sech) envelope soliton for water waves: The blue line is the carrier signal, while the red line is the envelope soliton

Dispersion and nonlinearity can interact to produce permanent and localized wave forms. Consider a pulse of light traveling in glass. This pulse can be thought of as consisting of light of several different frequencies. Since glass shows dispersion, these different frequencies travel at different speeds and the shape of the pulse therefore changes over time. However, also the nonlinear Kerr effect occurs; the refractive index of a material at a given frequency depends on the light's amplitude or strength. If the pulse has just the right shape, the Kerr effect exactly cancels the dispersion effect and the pulse's shape does not change over time. Thus, the pulse is a soliton.

Many exactly solvable models have soliton solutions, including the Korteweg–de Vries equation, the nonlinear Schrödinger equation, the coupled nonlinear Schrödinger equation, and the sine-Gordon equation. The soliton solutions are typically obtained by means of the inverse scattering transform, and owe their stability to the integrability of the field equations. The mathematical theory of these equations is a broad and very active field of mathematical research.

The Kadomtsev–Petviashvili equation, introduced by Boris Kadomtsev and Vladimir Petviashvili in 1970, generalizes the KdV equation to two spatial dimensions. Within its framework, a soliton that is uniform along one transverse direction (a line soliton) is found to be unstable to transverse perturbations in media with positive dispersion. Subsequently, in 1975, Vladimir E. Zakharov derived the dispersion relation for infinitesimal transverse perturbations of the KdV soliton using the inverse scattering transform; this work is reviewed by Yuri Kivshar and D. E. Pelinovsky.

Oblique interaction of shallow-water waves, forming a Mach stem.

Two years later, in 1977, Alan C. Newell and L. G. Redekopp recognized that collisions of solitons in more than one dimension can lead to the formation of new solitons, a phenomenon called resonant interaction, in the context of the KP and nonlinear Schrödinger equations. John W. Miles observed that the oblique interaction of two line solitons becomes resonant at a critical angle and gave an early answer to the question of its practical consequences, a substantial increase in wave amplitude during the resonant Mach reflection. He showed that the observed Mach reflection of a solitary wave at a wall, which is geometrically similar to the reflection of shock waves, can be described as a resonant interaction among three obliquely oriented solitary waves.

Some types of tidal bore, a wave phenomenon of a few rivers including the River Severn, are 'undular': a wavefront followed by a train of solitons. Other solitons occur as the undersea internal waves, initiated by seabed topography, that propagate on the oceanic pycnocline. Atmospheric solitons also exist, such as the morning glory cloud of the Gulf of Carpentaria, where pressure solitons traveling in a temperature inversion layer produce vast linear roll clouds. The recent and not widely accepted soliton model in neuroscience proposes to explain the signal conduction within neurons as pressure solitons.

A topological soliton, also called a topological defect, is any solution of a set of partial differential equations that is stable against decay to the "trivial solution". Soliton stability is due to topological constraints, rather than integrability of the field equations. The constraints arise almost always because the differential equations must obey a set of boundary conditions, and the boundary has a nontrivial homotopy group, preserved by the differential equations. Thus, the differential equation solutions can be classified into homotopy classes.

No continuous transformation maps a soliton in one homotopy class to another. The solitons are truly distinct, and maintain their integrity, even in the face of extremely powerful forces. Examples of topological solitons include the screw dislocation in a crystalline lattice, the Dirac string and the magnetic monopole in electromagnetism, the Skyrmion and the Wess–Zumino–Witten model in quantum field theory, the magnetic skyrmion in condensed matter physics, and cosmic strings and domain walls in cosmology.

== Occurrences ==
=== Fiber optics ===
Much experimentation has been done using solitons in fiber optics applications. Solitons in a fiber optic system are described by the Manakov equations. Solitons' inherent stability make long-distance transmission possible without the use of repeaters, and could potentially double transmission capacity as well.

Year	Discovery
1973	Akira Hasegawa of AT&T Bell Labs was the first to suggest that solitons could exist in optical fibers, due to a balance between self-phase modulation and anomalous dispersion. Also in 1973 Robin Bullough made the first mathematical report of the existence of optical solitons. He also proposed the idea of a soliton-based transmission system to increase performance of optical telecommunications.
1987	Emplit et al. (1987) – from the Universities of Brussels and Limoges – made the first experimental observation of the propagation of a dark soliton, in an optical fiber.
1988	Linn F. Mollenauer and his team transmitted soliton pulses over 4,000 kilometers using a phenomenon called the Raman effect, named after Sir C. V. Raman who first described it in the 1920s, to provide optical gain in the fiber.
1991	A Bell Labs research team transmitted solitons error-free at 2.5 gigabits per second over more than 14,000 kilometers, using erbium optical fiber amplifiers (spliced-in segments of optical fiber containing the rare earth element erbium). Pump lasers, coupled to the optical amplifiers, activate the erbium, which energizes the light pulses.
1998	Thierry Georges and his team at France Telecom R&D Center, combining optical solitons of different wavelengths (wavelength-division multiplexing), demonstrated a composite data transmission of 1 terabit per second (1,000,000,000,000 units of information per second), not to be confused with Terabit-Ethernet. The above impressive experiments have not translated to actual commercial soliton system deployments however, in either terrestrial or submarine systems, chiefly due to the Gordon–Haus (GH) jitter. The GH jitter requires sophisticated, expensive compensatory solutions that ultimately makes dense wavelength-division multiplexing (DWDM) soliton transmission in the field unattractive, compared to the conventional non-return-to-zero/return-to-zero paradigm. Further, the likely future adoption of the more spectrally efficient phase-shift-keyed/QAM formats makes soliton transmission even less viable, due to the Gordon–Mollenauer effect. Consequently, the long-haul fiberoptic transmission soliton has remained a laboratory curiosity.
2000	Steven Cundiff predicted the existence of a vector soliton in a birefringence fiber cavity passively mode locking through a semiconductor saturable absorber mirror (SESAM). The polarization state of such a vector soliton could either be rotating or locked depending on the cavity parameters.
2008	D. Y. Tang et al. observed a novel form of higher-order vector soliton from the perspectives of experiments and numerical simulations. Different types of vector solitons and the polarization state of vector solitons have been investigated by his group.

=== Biology ===
Solitons may occur in proteins and DNA. Solitons are related to the low-frequency collective motion in proteins and DNA.

A recently developed model in neuroscience proposes that signals, in the form of density waves, are conducted within neurons in the form of solitons. Solitons can be described as almost lossless energy transfer in biomolecular chains or lattices as wave-like propagations of coupled conformational and electronic disturbances.

=== Materials physics ===
Solitons can occur in materials, such as ferroelectrics, in the form of domain walls. Ferroelectric materials exhibit spontaneous polarization, or electric dipoles, which are coupled to configurations of the material structure. Domains of oppositely poled polarizations can be present within a single material as the structural configurations corresponding to opposing polarizations are equally favorable with no presence of external forces. The domain boundaries, or "walls", that separate these local structural configurations are regions of lattice dislocations. The domain walls can propagate as the polarizations, and thus, the local structural configurations can switch within a domain with applied forces such as electric bias or mechanical stress. Consequently, the domain walls can be described as solitons, discrete regions of dislocations that are able to slip or propagate and maintain their shape in width and length.

In recent literature, ferroelectricity has been observed in twisted bilayers of van der Waals materials such as molybdenum disulfide and graphene. The moiré superlattice that arises from the relative twist angle between the van der Waals monolayers generates regions of different stacking orders of the atoms within the layers. These regions exhibit inversion symmetry breaking structural configurations that enable ferroelectricity at the interface of these monolayers. The domain walls that separate these regions are composed of partial dislocations where different types of stresses, and thus, strains are experienced by the lattice. It has been observed that soliton or domain wall propagation across a moderate length of the sample (order of nanometers to micrometers) can be initiated with applied stress from an AFM tip on a fixed region. The soliton propagation carries the mechanical perturbation with little loss in energy across the material, which enables domain switching in a domino-like fashion.

It has also been observed that the type of dislocations found at the walls can affect propagation parameters such as direction. For instance, STM measurements showed four types of strains of varying degrees of shear, compression, and tension at domain walls depending on the type of localized stacking order in twisted bilayer graphene. Different slip directions of the walls are achieved with different types of strains found at the domains, influencing the direction of the soliton network propagation.

Nonidealities such as disruptions to the soliton network and surface impurities can influence soliton propagation as well. Domain walls can meet at nodes and get effectively pinned, forming triangular domains, which have been readily observed in various ferroelectric twisted bilayer systems. In addition, closed loops of domain walls enclosing multiple polarization domains can inhibit soliton propagation and thus, switching of polarizations across it. Also, domain walls can propagate and meet at wrinkles and surface inhomogeneities within the van der Waals layers, which can act as obstacles obstructing the propagation.

=== Magnets ===
In magnets, there also exist different types of solitons and other nonlinear waves. These magnetic solitons are an exact solution of classical nonlinear differential equations — magnetic equations, e.g. the Landau–Lifshitz equation, continuum Heisenberg model, Ishimori equation, nonlinear Schrödinger equation and others.

=== Nuclear physics ===
Atomic nuclei may exhibit solitonic behavior. Here the whole nuclear wave function is predicted to exist as a soliton under certain conditions of temperature and energy. Such conditions are suggested to exist in the cores of some stars in which the nuclei would not react but pass through each other unchanged, retaining their soliton waves through a collision between nuclei.

The Skyrme Model is a model of nuclei in which each nucleus is considered to be a topologically stable soliton solution of a field theory with conserved baryon number.

== Bions ==
The bound state of two solitons is known as a bion, or in systems where the bound state periodically oscillates, a breather. The interference-type forces between solitons could be used in making bions. However, these forces are very sensitive to their relative phases. Alternatively, the bound state of solitons could be formed by dressing atoms with highly excited Rydberg levels. The resulting self-generated potential profile features an inner attractive soft-core supporting the 3D self-trapped soliton, an intermediate repulsive shell (barrier) preventing solitons' fusion, and an outer attractive layer (well) used for completing the bound state resulting in giant stable soliton molecules. In this scheme, the distance and size of the individual solitons in the molecule can be controlled dynamically with the laser adjustment.

In field theory bion usually refers to the solution of the Born–Infeld model. The name appears to have been coined by G. W. Gibbons in order to distinguish this solution from the conventional soliton, understood as a regular, finite-energy (and usually stable) solution of a differential equation describing some physical system. The word regular means a smooth solution carrying no sources at all. However, the solution of the Born–Infeld model still carries a source in the form of a Dirac-delta function at the origin. As a consequence it displays a singularity in this point (although the electric field is everywhere regular). In some physical contexts (for instance string theory) this feature can be important, which motivated the introduction of a special name for this class of solitons.

On the other hand, when gravity is added (i.e. when considering the coupling of the Born–Infeld model to general relativity) the corresponding solution is called EBIon, where "E" stands for Einstein.

== Alcubierre drive ==
Solitons have been proposed as a means of powering an Alcubierre drive without the need for negative mass. However, this has been found to violate known physics.

== See also ==
- Compacton
- Dissipative soliton
- Freak wave – Unexpectedly large transient ocean surface wave
- Instanton – Solitons in Euclidean spacetime
- Nematicon
- Non-topological soliton – Special class of solitons
- Nonlinear Schrödinger equation – Nonlinear form of the Schrödinger equation
- Oscillon – Soliton-like phenomenon that occurs in granular and other dissipative media
- Pattern formation – Study of how patterns form by self-organization in nature
- Peakon
- Peregrine soliton – Analytic solution of the nonlinear Schrödinger equation
- Q-ball – Type of non-topological soliton
- Sine-Gordon equation – Nonlinear partial differential equation
- Soliton (optics) – Term in optics
- Soliton (topological) – Topologically stable solution of a partial differential equation
- Soliton distribution – Probability distribution for erasure codes
- Soliton model
- Topological quantum number – Physical quantities with discrete values
- Vector soliton – Type of wave
