= Oscillon =

Soliton-like phenomenon that occurs in granular and other dissipative media

In physics, an oscillon is a soliton-like phenomenon that occurs in granular and other dissipative media. Oscillons in granular media result from vertically vibrating a plate with a layer of uniform particles placed freely on top. When the sinusoidal vibrations are of the correct amplitude and frequency and the layer of sufficient thickness, a localized wave, referred to as an oscillon, can be formed by locally disturbing the particles. This meta-stable state will remain for a long time (many hundreds of thousands of oscillations) in the absence of further perturbation. An oscillon changes form with each collision of the grain layer and the plate, switching between a peak that projects above the grain layer to a crater like depression with a small rim. This self-sustaining state was named by analogy with the soliton, which is a localized wave that maintains its integrity as it moves. Whereas solitons occur as travelling waves in a fluid or as electromagnetic waves in a waveguide, oscillons may be stationary.

Oscillons of opposite phase will attract over short distances and form 'bonded' pairs. Oscillons of like phase repel. Oscillons have been observed forming 'molecule' like structures and long chains. In comparison, solitons do not form bound states.

Stable interacting localized waves with subharmonic response were discovered and named oscillons at The University of Texas at Austin. Solitary bursts had been reported earlier in a quasi-two-dimensional grain layer at the University of Paris, but these transient events were unstable and no bonding interaction or subharmonic response was reported.

The cause of this phenomenon is currently under debate; the most likely connection is with the mathematical theory of chaos and may give insights into the way patterns in sand form.

The experimental procedure is similar to that used to form Chladni figures of sand on a vibrating plate. Researchers realized that these figures say more about the vibrational modes of the plate than the response of the sand and created an experimental set-up that minimized outside effects, using a shallow layer of brass balls in a vacuum and a rigid plate . When they vibrated the plate at critical amplitude, they found that the balls formed a localized vibrating structure when perturbed which lasted indefinitely.

Oscillons have also been experimentally observed in thin parametrically vibrated layers of viscous fluid and colloidal suspensions. Oscillons have been associated with Faraday waves because they require similar resonance conditions.

Nonlinear electrostatic oscillations on a plasma boundary can also appear in the form of oscillons. This was discovered in 1989.

== Oscillons in particle physics and cosmology ==
Oscillons have been widely studied in particle physics and cosmology as nonlinear, localized excitations of scalar fields with attractive self-interactions. Many scalar field theories motivated by physics beyond the Standard Model, including models involving axions, axion-like particles, and inflaton fields, admit oscillon solutions during nonequilibrium stages of their evolution.

In cosmological settings, oscillons are commonly found to form after cosmic inflation, particularly during the reheating or preheating phases, when parametric resonance and nonlinear mode coupling amplify scalar field inhomogeneities. Numerical simulations have shown that oscillon formation is a generic outcome in a broad class of inflationary potentials and scalar field theories with suitable self-interaction terms.

Oscillons have also been investigated in axion and axion-like particle models, where the periodic or anharmonic structure of the scalar potential can support long-lived oscillon configurations. In these contexts, oscillons have been studied as possible transient structures in the early universe and as contributors to nontrivial dark sector dynamics, depending on the parameters of the scalar potential.

The properties and lifetimes of oscillons in particle physics and cosmology have been analyzed using both direct numerical simulations and semi-analytic methods, including quasibreather-based approaches, which allow the study of oscillon evolution over timescales inaccessible to direct simulation.

== See also ==
- Cymatics
