= John Scott Russell =

Naval engineer

John Scott Russell FRSE FRS FRSA
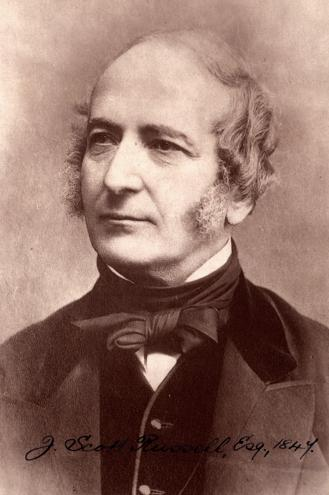
- John Scott Russell in 1847
- Born: 9 May 1808; Parkhead, Glasgow, Scotland
- Died: 8 June 1882 (aged 74); Ventnor, Isle of Wight, England
- Education: University of Edinburgh, University of St. Andrews, University of Glasgow
- Spouse: 1. Frances Granville Downes 2. Harriette Osborne
- Children: Osborne Russell, Norman Scott Russell, Louisa Scott Russell, Mary Rachel Scott Russell, Alice M. Scott Russell
- Parent(s): David Russell and Agnes Clark Scott
- Engineering career
- Institutions: Royal Society of Edinburgh (Councillor 1838-9), Royal Society, Institution of Civil Engineers (Vice President), Institution of Naval Architects (Vice President), Society of Arts (Secretary 1845-50)
- Awards: Keith Prize

John Scott Russell (9 May 1808 – 8 June 1882) was a Scottish civil engineer, naval architect and shipbuilder who built Great Eastern in collaboration with Isambard Kingdom Brunel. He made the discovery of the wave of translation that gave birth to the modern study of solitons, and developed the wave-line system of ship construction.

Russell was a promoter of the Great Exhibition of 1851.

== Early life ==
John Russell was born on the 9th May 1808 in Parkhead, Glasgow, the son of Reverend David Russell and Agnes Clark Scott. He spent one year at the University of St. Andrews before transferring to the University of Glasgow. It was while at the University of Glasgow that he added his mother's maiden name, Scott, to his own, to become John Scott Russell. He graduated from Glasgow University in 1825 at the age of 17 and moved to Edinburgh where he taught mathematics and science at the Leith Mechanics' Institute, achieving the highest attendance in the city.

On the death of Sir John Leslie, Professor of Natural Philosophy at the University of Edinburgh in 1832, Scott Russell, though only 24 years old, was elected to temporarily fill the vacancy pending the election of a permanent professor, due to his proficiency in the natural sciences and popularity as a lecturer. But although encouraged to stand for the permanent position he refused to compete with another candidate he admired and thereafter concentrated the engineering profession and experimental research on a large scale.

== Family life ==
Russell's first wife was Frances Granville Downes of Ann Street in Stockbridge, Edinburgh, whom he married on April 17, 1832 St John’s Episcopal Church, Edinburgh. Frances was the eldest daughter of Major Charles Downes of the Veteran Battalion. Unfortunately, Frances died a year later on 23 April 1833, aged only 20, and is buried in St John’s churchyard with other Downes relatives.

He married Harriette Osborne, daughter of the Irish baronet Sir Daniel Toler Osborne and Harriette Trench, daughter of the Earl of Clancarty in Dublin in 1839; they had two sons (Norman survived) and three daughters, Louise (1841–1878), Rachel (1845–1882) and Alice. In London they lived for five years in a house provided for the secretary of the Society of Arts and then moved to Sydenham Hill, which became a centre of attention especially after Russell and his friends moved Paxton's glasshouse for the Great Exhibition to the Crystal Palace close by.

Arthur Sullivan and his friend Frederic Clay were frequent visitors at the Scott Russell home in the mid-1860s; Clay became engaged to Alice, and Sullivan wooed Rachel. While Clay was from a wealthy family, Sullivan was still a poor young composer from a poor family; the Scott Russells welcomed the engagement of Alice to Clay, who, however broke it off, but forbade the relationship between Sullivan and Rachel, although the two continued to see each other covertly. At some point in 1868, Sullivan started a simultaneous (and secret) affair with Louise (1841–1878). Both relationships had ceased by early 1869.

The American engineer Alexander Lyman Holley befriended Scott Russell and his family on his various visits to London at the time of the construction of Great Eastern. Holley also visited Scott Russell's house in Sydenham. As a result of this, Holley, and his colleague Zerah Colburn, travelled on the maiden voyage of Great Eastern from Southampton to New York in June 1860. Scott Russell's son, Norman, stayed with Holley at his house in Brooklyn — Norman also travelled on the maiden voyage, one voyage that John Scott Russell did not make.

His son, Norman, followed his father in becoming a naval architect, contributing to the Institution of Naval Architects which his father had founded.

== Steam carriage ==
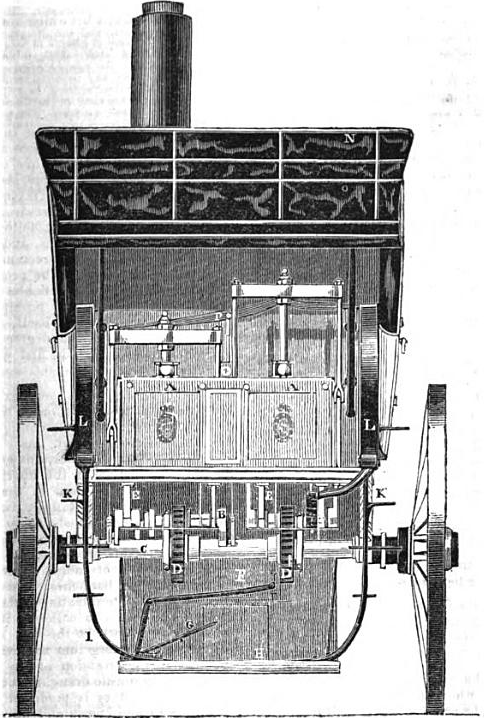
The steam carriage, with boiler below the axle and two pistons

While in Edinburgh he experimented with steam engines, using a square boiler for which he developed a method of staying the surface of the boiler which became universal. The Scottish Steam Carriage Company was formed producing a steam carriage with two cylinders developing 12 horsepower each. Six were constructed in 1834, well-sprung and fitted out to high standard, which from March 1834 ran between Glasgow's George Square and the Tontine Hotel in Paisley at hourly intervals at an average speed of 10 mph.

The road trustees objected that it wore out the road and put a thick layer of loose stones on the road to obstruct passage. Horse-drawn carriages and carts were stopped completely, but the steam carriages got through, After some time, one of the wheels of a steam carriage broke, causing the whole weight of the carriage to bear on the boiler, which was slung below the axles. It exploded, killing five. The Court of Session interdicted the carriages from running. Two of the coaches were sent to London where they ran for a short time between London and Greenwich.

== The wave of translation ==
In 1834, while conducting experiments to determine the most efficient design for canal boats, he discovered a phenomenon that he described as the wave of translation. In fluid dynamics the wave is now called Russell's solitary wave. The discovery is described here in his own words:

I was observing the motion of a boat which was rapidly drawn along a narrow channel by a pair of horses, when the boat suddenly stopped—not so the mass of water in the channel which it had put in motion; it accumulated round the prow of the vessel in a state of violent agitation, then suddenly leaving it behind, rolled forward with great velocity, assuming the form of a large solitary elevation, a rounded, smooth and well-defined heap of water, which continued its course along the channel apparently without change of form or diminution of speed. I followed it on horseback, and overtook it still rolling on at a rate of some eight or nine miles an hour [14 km/h], preserving its original figure some thirty feet [9 m] long and a foot to a foot and a half [30−45 cm] in height. Its height gradually diminished, and after a chase of one or two miles [2–3 km] I lost it in the windings of the channel. Such, in the month of August 1834, was my first chance interview with that singular and beautiful phenomenon which I have called the Wave of Translation.

The phenomenon of solitary waves had previously been reported in 1826 by Giorgio Bidone in Turin, but Bidone's work seems to have gone unnoticed by researchers in the Netherlands and Britain, despite being mentioned in the Edinburgh Journal of Science in the same year.

Scott Russell spent some time making practical and theoretical investigations of these waves. He built wave tanks at his home and noticed some key properties:

- The waves are stable, and can travel over very large distances (normal waves would tend to either flatten out, or steepen and topple over)
- The speed depends on the size of the wave, and its width on the depth of water.
- Unlike normal waves they will never merge—so a small wave is overtaken by a large one, rather than the two combining.
- If a wave is too big for the depth of water, it splits into two, one big and one small.

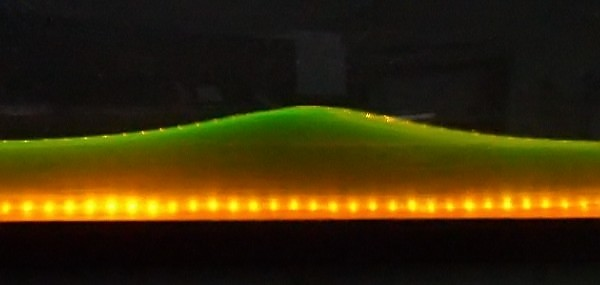
Solitary wave in a laboratory wave channel

Scott Russell's experimental work seemed at contrast with Isaac Newton's and Daniel Bernoulli's theories of hydrodynamics. George Biddell Airy and George Gabriel Stokes had difficulty to accept Scott Russell's experimental observations because Scott Russell's observations could not be explained by the existing water-wave theories. Additional observations were reported by Henry Bazin in 1862 after experiments carried out in the canal de Bourgogne in France. In 1863, Bazin authored a research paper titled Recherches hydrauliques entreprises par M.H. Darcy (English: Hydraulic Researches Undertaken by M.H. Darcy) which featured the work of Scott Russell.

A Dutch translation of Bazin's work entitled Verslag aan de Fransche academie van wetenschappen over het gedeelte der verhandeling van Bazin, betrekkelijk de opstuwingen en de voortbeweging der golven (English: Report to the French Academy of Sciences on the portion of Bazin's treatise relating to surges and the propagation of waves) was featured in the proceedings of the Dutch Koninklijk Instituut van Ingenieurs (English: Royal Institute of Engineers) in 1869. Within the original French paper, and the translated work, the velocity of a solitary wave is given as:

$c = \sqrt{g(h+z)}$

The formula is denoted as "the law of Scott Russell" within the text. His contemporaries spent some time attempting to extend the theory but it would take until the 1870s before an explanation was provided.

Lord Rayleigh published a paper in Philosophical Magazine in 1876 to support John Scott Russell's experimental observation with his mathematical theory. In his 1876 paper, Lord Rayleigh mentioned Scott Russell's name and also admitted that the first theoretical treatment was by Joseph Valentin Boussinesq in 1871; Boussinesq had mentioned Scott Russell's name in his 1871 paper. Thus Scott Russell's observations on solitary waves were accepted as true by some prominent scientists within his own lifetime.

Korteweg and de Vries did not mention John Scott Russell's name at all in their 1895 paper but they did quote Boussinesq's paper in 1871 and Lord Rayleigh's paper in 1876. Although the paper by Korteweg and de Vries in 1895 was not the first theoretical treatment of this subject, it was a very important milestone in the history of the development of soliton theory.

It was not until the 1960s and the advent of modern computers that the significance of Scott Russell's discovery in physics, electronics, biology and especially fibre optics started to become understood, leading to the modern general theory of solitons.

Note that solitons are, by definition, unaltered in shape and speed by a collision with other solitons. So solitary waves on a water surface are not solitons – after the interaction of two (colliding or overtaking) solitary waves, they have changed slightly in amplitude and an oscillatory residual is left behind.

== Wave line system ==
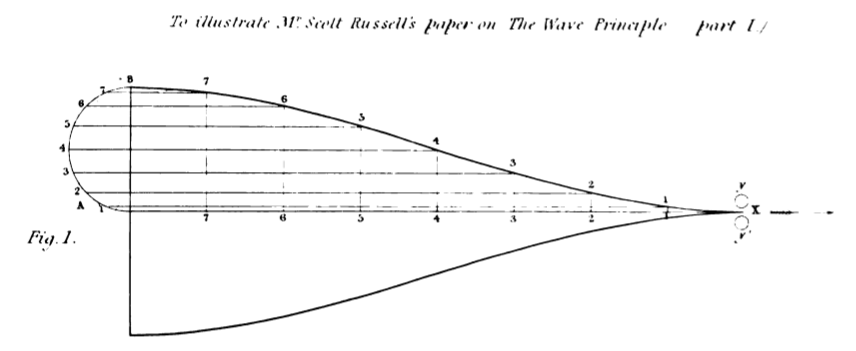
Scheme of the bow according to the waveline principle

Once Russell had a way of observing boats at hitherto unprecedented speeds at the front of his wave of translation, he tackled the more fundamental issue for boat design of finding the hull shape which gives the least resistance. This, he reasoned was concerned with moving the mass of water efficiently out of the way of the hull and then back to fill the gap after it has passed. By careful measurements with dynamometers he validated his theory that a versed sine wave produces the ideal shape.

Initially he thought that the stern could be a mirror of the stem, but soon realised that the removing water produced something closer to conventional waves than his solitary waves and ended up with a rounded stern with a catenary shape.

His studies produced a revolution in the design of hulls for merchant and navy vessels. Most ships of the time had rounded bows to optimise the cargo-carrying capacity, but starting from the 1840s the "extreme clipper ships" started to show concave bows as increasingly did steam ships culminating with Great Eastern. After his views were propounded by Commander Fishbourne, the American naval architect John W. Griffiths acknowledged the force of Russell's work in his Treatise on marine and naval architecture of 1850 though he was grudging in acknowledging a debt to Russell.

== Doppler effect ==
Scott Russell made one of the first experimental observations of the Doppler effect which he published in 1848. Christian Doppler published his theory in 1842.

== Professional association ==
Much of Russell's early experimental work had been conducted under the auspices of the British Association and throughout his life he contributed to the scientific and professional associations that were becoming more important in that era.

In 1844, the railway boom was at its height. Russell had contributed an article on the Steam engine and steam navigation for the 7th edition of Encyclopædia Britannica in 1841 which also appeared in book form. Charles Wentworth Dilke offered him the editorial position of a new weekly paper, the Railway Chronicle in London and the Russell family was soon in a small two-room flat in Westminster. The next year he also became the secretary of the committee set up by the Royal Society of Arts to organise a national exhibition, which provided them with a town house in the Strand. Russell soon introduced Henry Cole to the committee and when, a few weeks before the first exhibition in 1847, there were no exhibitors, Russell and Cole spent three whole days travelling around London to enlist manufacturers and shopkeepers. This and two subsequent exhibitions were such a success that an international version was planned for 1851. By this time Russell had once again started shipbuilding, the railway boom having finished, and although he became the RSA's appointed secretary for the Great Exhibition, Henry Cole was by this time taking the lead, and he ended up with only a Gold Medal as his reward for much work.

Russell became a member of the Institution of Civil Engineers in 1847 attending regularly and making frequent contributions, was elected to its council in 1857 and became a vice-president in 1862. However he became involved in a financial dispute with Sir William Armstrong and didn't become president. But "as a speaker, and particularly as an after-dinner speaker, he had few equals." He was elected a Fellow of the Royal Society in 1849 although he contributed less.

In 1860 at a meeting at his house in Sydenham, the Institution of Naval Architects was set up, with Russell as one of the professional vice-presidents. He attended most meetings and rarely failed to comment. In 1864 he published a massive 3-volume treatise on The Modern System of Naval Architecture which laid out the profiles of many of the new ships being built.

His obituary said of naval architecture:

"it may be said that on commencing his career he found it the most empirical of arts, and he left it one of the most exact of engineering sciences. To this great result many others contributed largely besides himself; but his personal investigations, and the theories which he deduced from them, gave the first impetus to scientific naval architecture".

== Ship building ==
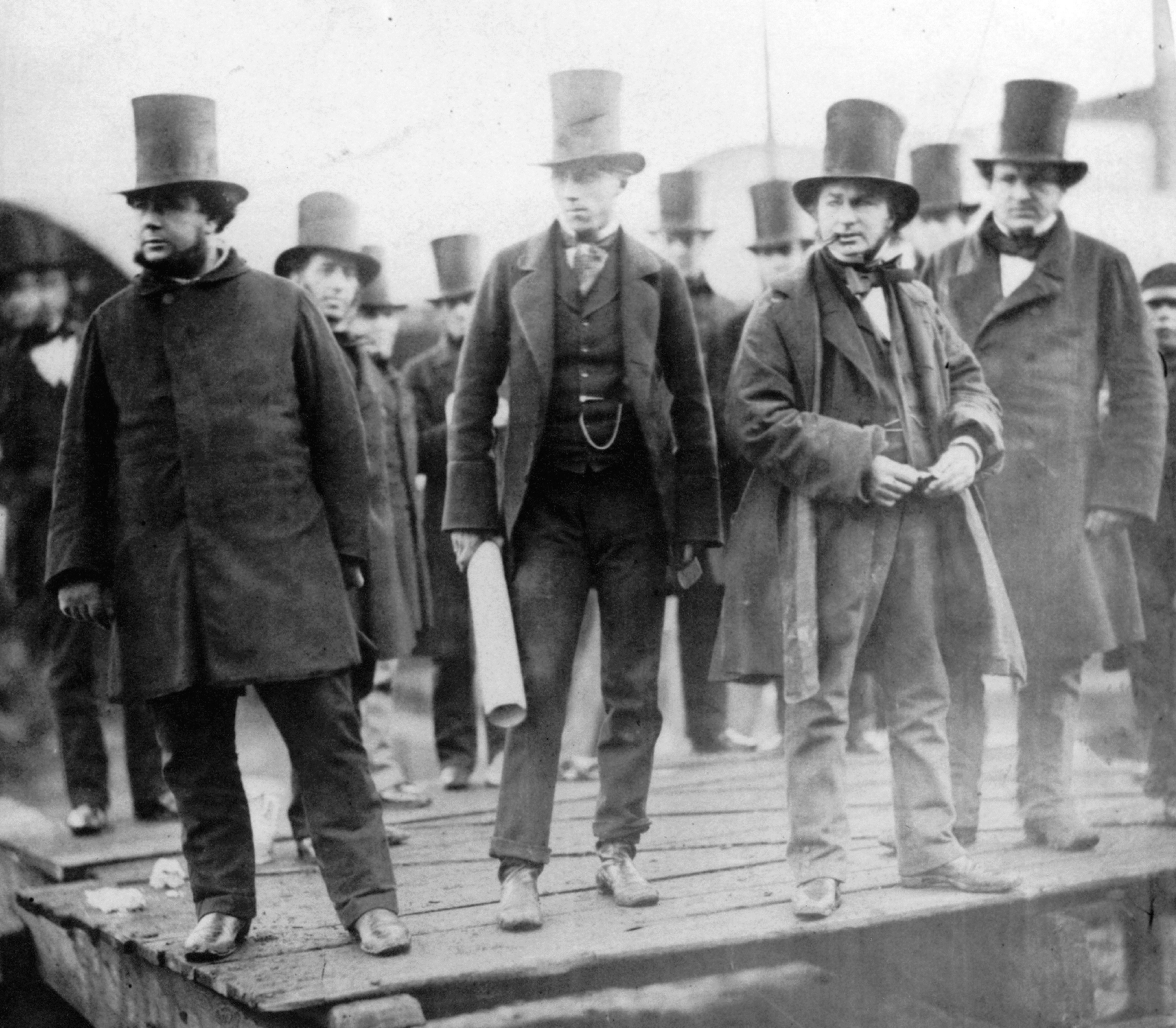
John Scott Russell (builder), Henry Wakefield (Russell's assistant), Isambard Kingdom Brunel (designer) and Lord Derby at the launching of Great Eastern

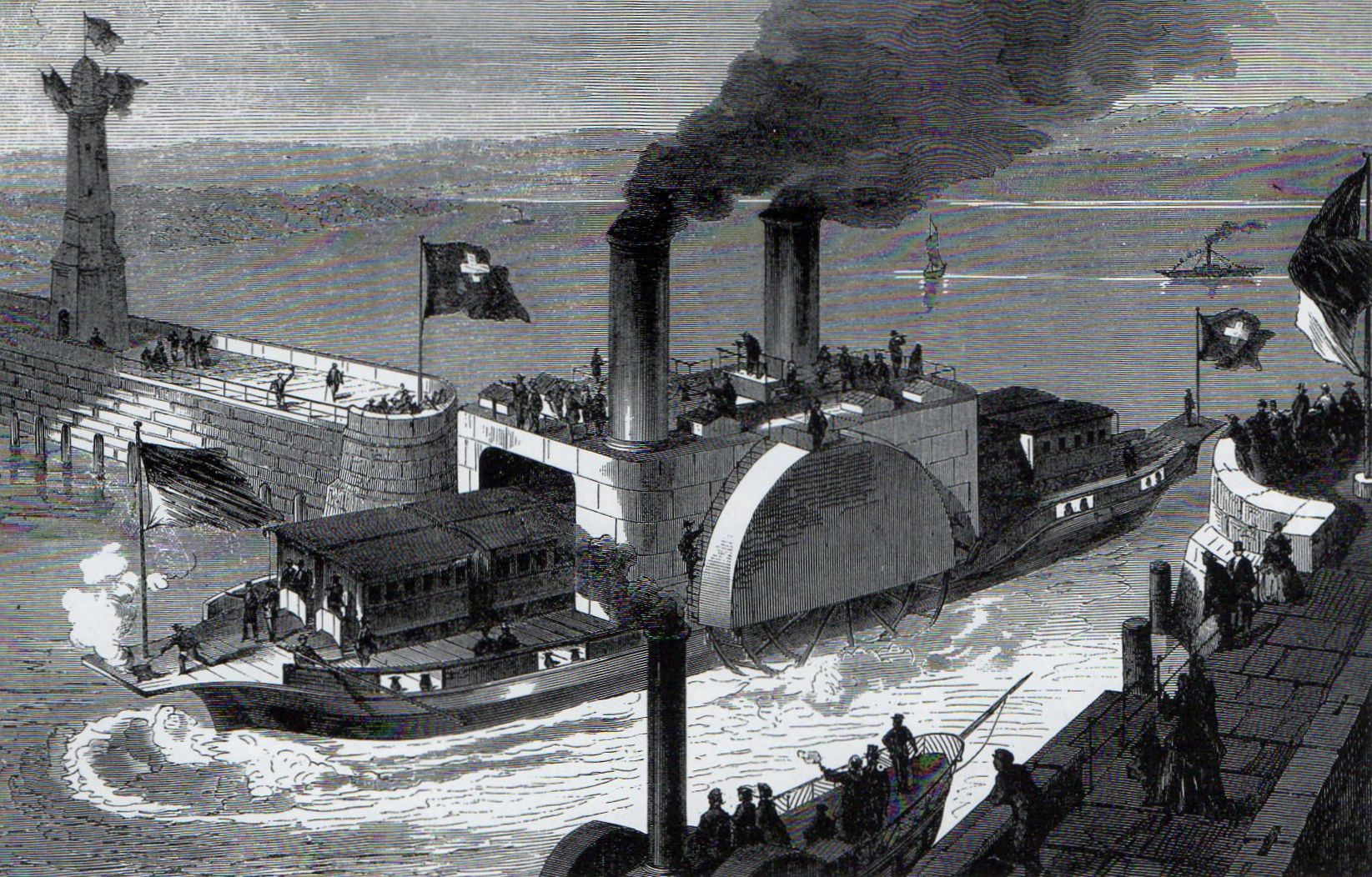
Maiden voyage of the Bodensee Trajekt, 1869

From around 1838, Scott Russell was employed at the small Greenock shipyard of Thomson and Spiers where he introduced his wave-line system to a series of Royal Mail ships, together with many other innovations. After the shipyard was taken over by Caird, he decided to move to London and in 1848 purchased the Millwall Iron Works shipbuilding company. He built two ships for Brunel for the Australia run, much the same size as Brunel's SS Great Britain, Adelaide and Victoria. Problems with refuelling and water led Brunel to think in terms of larger ships for this voyage, but five more were built in the same class.

Before they started any business together, he was held in high regard by Isambard Kingdom Brunel who made him a partner in his project to build Great Eastern. Although the original conception, the cellular construction and the joint use of paddle and screw were Brunel's ideas, "the ship embodies the wave-line form, the longitudinal system of construction, the complete and partial bulkheads, and other details of construction which were peculiarly Scott Russell’s". The project was plagued with a number of problems—Scott Russell put in a bid which was far too low with the result that he was bankrupt halfway through, though he recovered to finish the job; but it was Brunel that insisted on a sideways launch rather than the dry dock that Russell preferred. Great Eastern was eventually launched in 1858. Scott Russell was a better scientist than a businessman and his reputation never fully recovered from his financial irregularities, gross neglect of duty and disputes. As L. T. C. Rolt writes in his biography of Brunel "That Russell had indeed misled Brunel and betrayed his trust was now becoming the more lamentably apparent with every day that passed".

During the 1850s he argued within the Navy for the construction of iron warships and the first design, HMS Warrior, is said by some to be a "Russell ship". He afterwards complained about the secrecy that prevented an open discussion of the issues, criticizing those within the Navy who argued that iron ships could not be protected.

At a time when all previous train ferries were riverine vessels, in 1868 Scott Russell designed a train ferry for service on Lake Constance, the Bodensee Trajekt, which entered service in 1869. This was the world's first cross-lake train ferry. The Bodensee Trajekt had to meet the unusual requirement that its draft not exceed six feet (1.85m). He achieved this by using the superstructure to carry the stresses of the train. (It was not until 1892 that the first Lake Michigan cross-lake train ferry, the Ann Arbor No. 1, designed by Frank E. Kirby, entered service.) Scott Russell used the design of the Bodensee Trajekt as the basis of a cross-channel ferry that could manage the shallow harbour of Dover, but this was not realised until 1933.

== The Vienna Rotunda ==
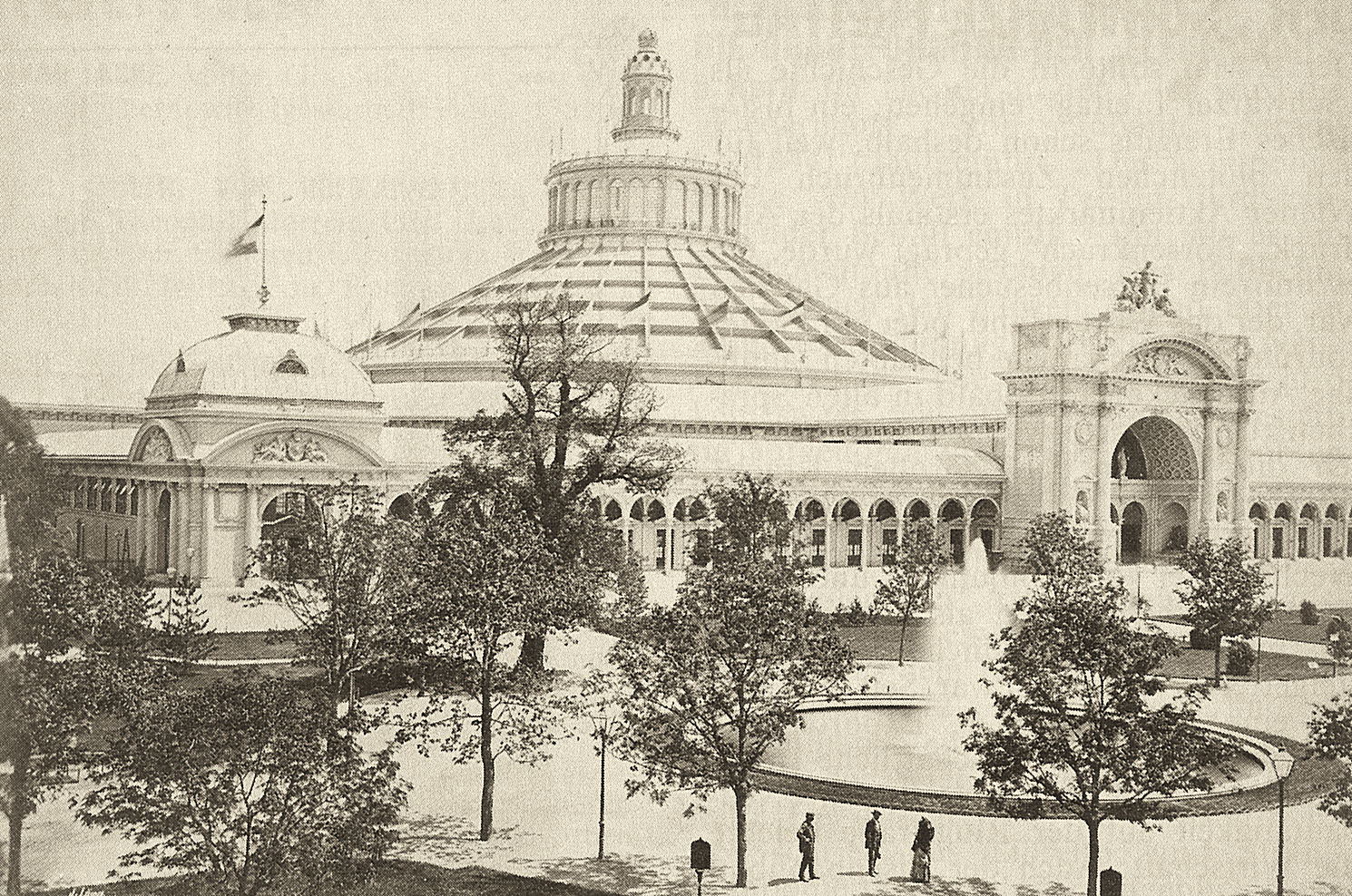
The Rotunde

Although his design for the Great Exhibition was trumped by that of Joseph Paxton, Scott Russell did design the Rotunde for the 1873 Vienna Exposition. At 108 metres (354 ft) in diameter it was for nearly a century the largest cupola in the world, having no ties to obstruct the view. Some consider it his greatest structural engineering achievement.

== Honours and awards ==
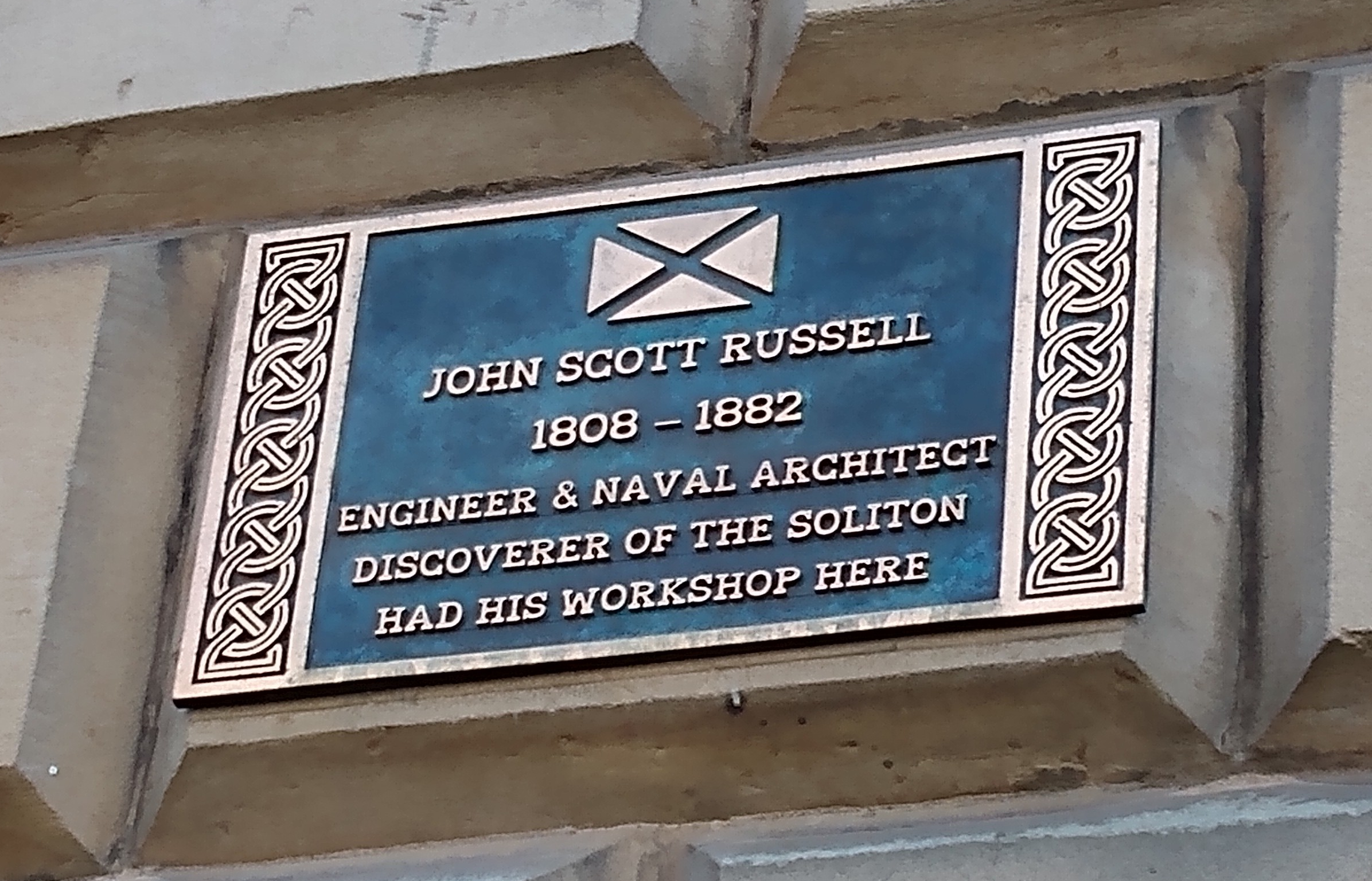
A plaque marking the workshop of John Scott Russell at 8 Stafford Street in Edinburgh

In 1838 he was awarded the gold Keith Medal by the Royal Society of Edinburgh for his paper "On the Laws by which water opposes Resistance to the Motion of Floating Bodies".

He was elected a Fellow of the Royal Society in June 1849 for Memoirs on "The great Solitary Wave of the First Order, or the Wave of Translation" published in the Transactions of the Royal Society of Edinburgh, and of several Memoirs in the Reports of the British Association.

In 1995, the aqueduct which carries the Union Canal – the same canal where he observed his Wave of Translation – over the Edinburgh Bypass (A720) was named the Scott Russell Aqueduct in his memory. Also in 1995, the hydrodynamic soliton effect was reproduced near the place where John Scott Russell observed hydrodynamic solitons in 1834.

A building at Heriot-Watt University is named after him.

In 2019 he was inducted into the Scottish Engineering Hall of Fame

== Publications ==
His 1844 paper has become a classical paper and is quite frequently cited in soliton-related papers or books even after more than one hundred and fifty years.

- Russell, J. Scott (1845). "Report on Waves". Report of the fourteenth meeting of the British Association for the Advancement of Science, York, September 1844 (PDF). London: John Murray. 311–390, Plates XLVII–LVII.
- Russell, J. Scott (1864). The Modern System of Naval Architecture. London: Day and Son. OCLC 80429969.
- Russell, J. Scott (1885). The Wave of Translation in the Oceans of Water, Air, and Ether. London: Trübner & Co. OCLC 39005948.

== Sources ==
- Ainger, Michael (2002). Gilbert and Sullivan – A Dual Biography. Oxford: Oxford University Press. ISBN 0-19-514769-3.
- Darrigol, Olivier (2005). Worlds of Flow: A History of Hydrodynamics from the Bernoullis to Prandtl. Oxford University Press. ISBN 0-19-856843-6. includes discussion on the discovery of solitons
- Emmerson, George S. (1977). John Scott Russell: A Great Victorian Engineer and Naval Architect. John Murray. ISBN 0-7195-3393-7.
- "Obituary of John Scott Russell". The Times. Archived from the original on 25 May 2011.
