= James Macklin Hyman =

American mathematician

James Macklin "Mac" Hyman (born 1950) is an applied mathematician formerly at Los Alamos National Laboratory and currently at Tulane University in the United States. He received his undergraduate degree from Tulane University and his PhD in 1976 from NYU's Courant Institute of Mathematical Sciences under Peter Lax with thesis The method of lines solution of partial differential equations.

Hyman served as president of the Society for Industrial and Applied Mathematics (SIAM) in 2003–2005. He was named a fellow of the Society for Industrial and Applied Mathematics in 2009.
