= Shiina esterification =

Shiina esterification is an organic chemical reaction that synthesizes carboxylic esters from nearly equal amounts of carboxylic acids and alcohols by using aromatic carboxylic acid anhydrides as dehydration condensation agents. In 1994, Prof. Isamu Shiina (Tokyo University of Science, Japan) reported an acidic coupling method using a Lewis acid, and, in 2002, a basic esterification using a nucleophilic catalyst.

== Mechanism ==
The successive addition of carboxylic acids and alcohols into a system containing aromatic carboxylic acid anhydride and catalyst produces corresponding carboxylic esters through the process shown in the following figure. In acidic Shiina esterification, Lewis acid catalysts are used, while nucleophilic catalysts are used for Shiina esterification under basic conditions.

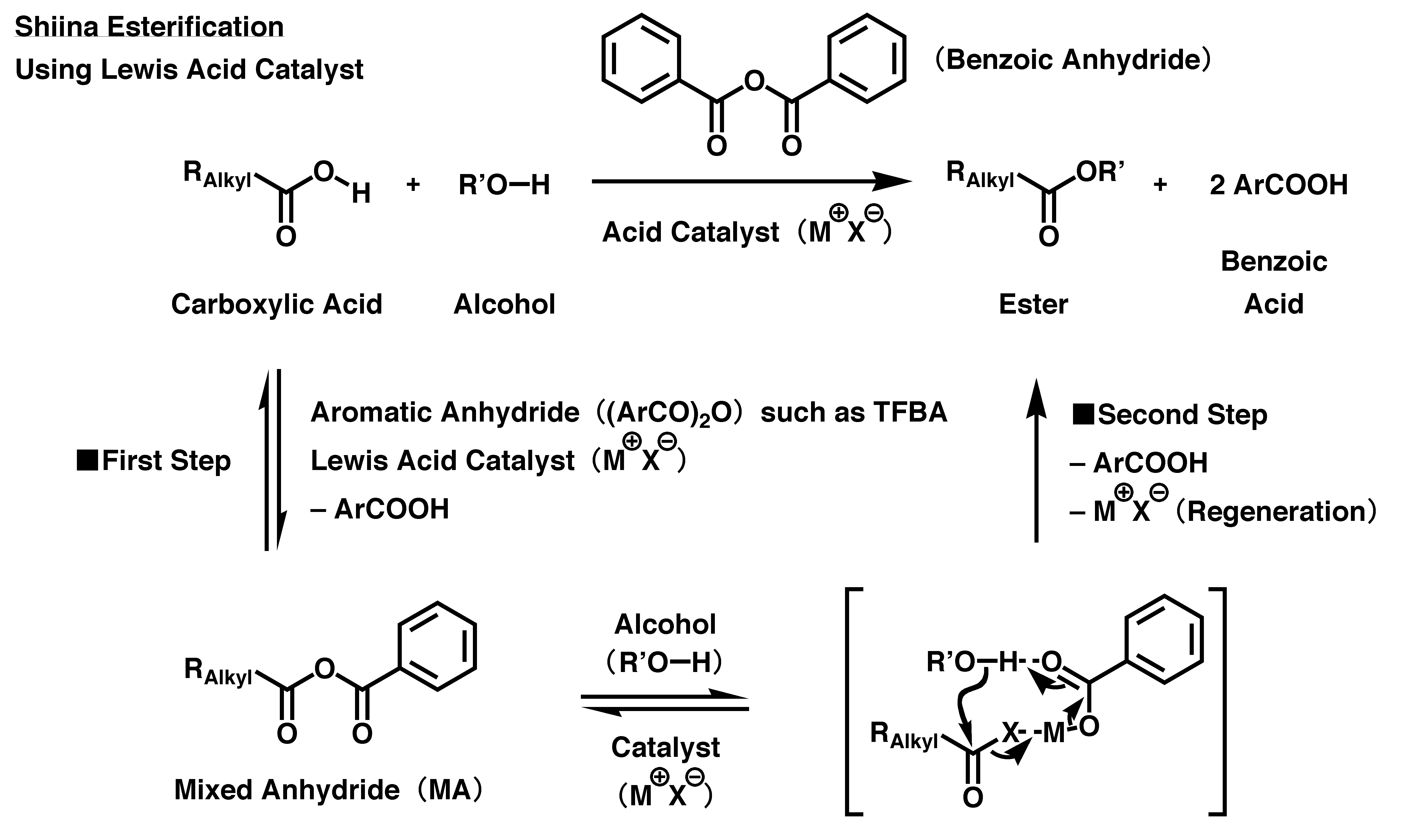
Shiina esterification using Lewis acid catalyst

In the acidic reaction, 4-trifluoromethylbenzoic anhydride (TFBA) is mainly used as a dehydration condensation agent. First, the Lewis acid catalyst activates the TFBA, and then a carboxyl group in carboxylic acid reacts with the activated TFBA to produce mixed anhydride (MA) once. Then, a carbonyl group derived from the carboxylic acid in MA is selectively activated and is attacked by a hydroxyl group in the alcohol through intermolecular nucleophilic substitution. Simultaneously, residual aromatic carboxylic acid salt, which is derived from the MA, acts as a deprotonation agent, causing the esterification to progress and produce the desired carboxylic ester. To balance the reaction, each TFBA accepts the atoms of one water molecule from its starting materials, i.e., the carboxylic acid and alcohol, and then changes itself into two molecules of 4-trifluoromethylbenzoic acid at the end of the reaction. Since the Lewis acid catalyst is reproduced at the end of the reaction, only a small proportion of catalyst is needed relative to the starting material to drive the reaction forward.

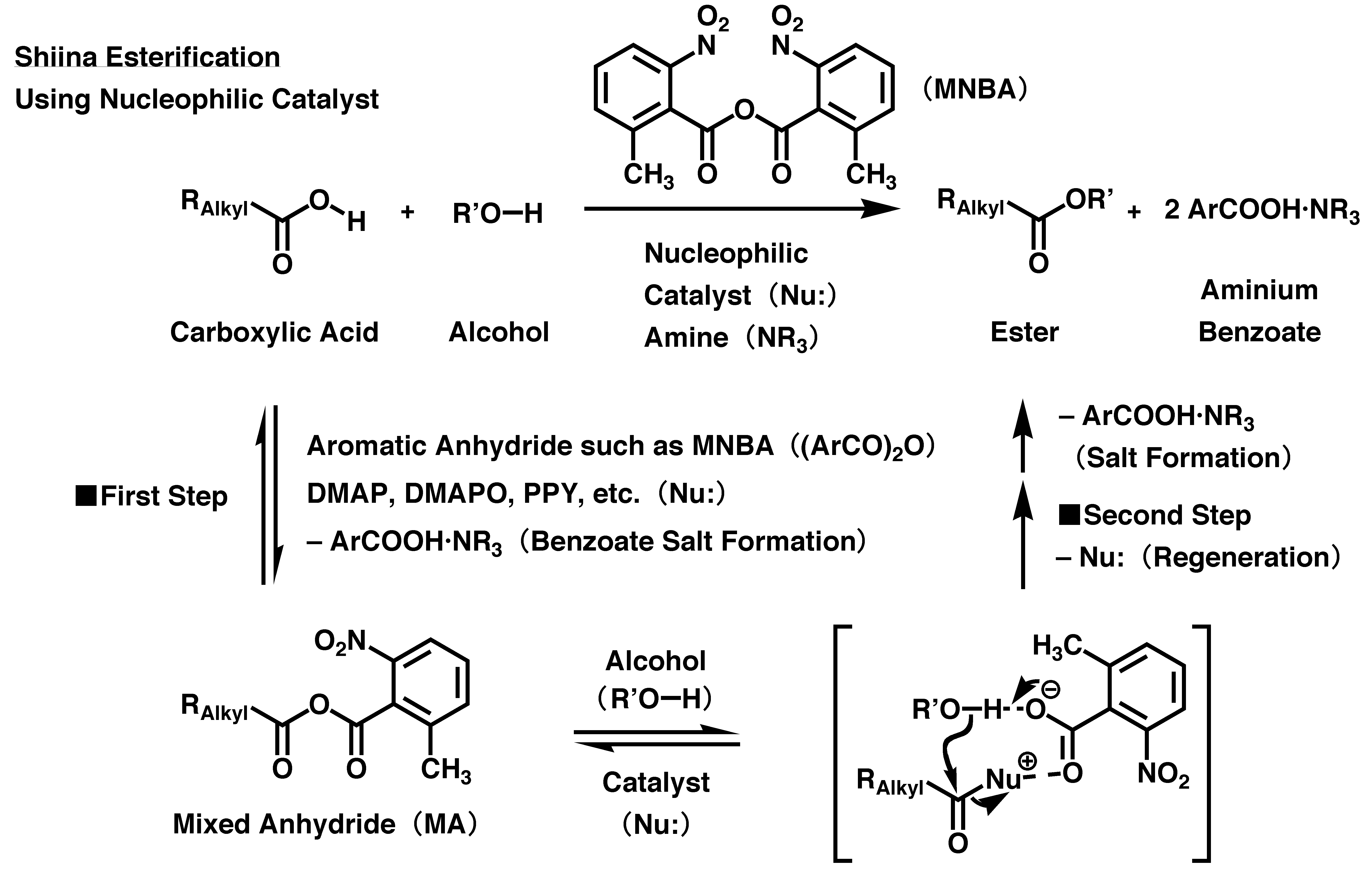

In the basic reaction, 2-methyl-6-nitrobenzoic anhydride (MNBA) is primarily used as a dehydration condensation agent. First, the nucleophilic catalyst acts on the MNBA to produce activated acyl carboxylate. The reaction of carboxyl group in the carboxylic acid with the activated acyl carboxylate produces the corresponding MA, in the same manner as in the acidic reaction. Then, the nucleophilic catalyst acts selectively on a carbonyl group derived from the carboxylic acid in MA to again produce activated acyl carboxylate. The hydroxyl group in the alcohol attacks its host molecule through intermolecular nucleophilic substitution, and at the same time, carboxylate anion, derived from 2-methyl-6-nitrobenzoic acid, acts as a deprotonation agent, promoting the progression of the esterification and producing the desired carboxylic ester. To balance the reaction, each MNBA accepts the atoms of one water molecule from its starting materials, changing itself into two molecules of the amine salt of 2-methyl-6-nitrobenzoic acid, and thus, terminating the reaction. Because the nucleophilic catalyst is reproduced at the end of the reaction, only small stoichiometric quantities are required.

== Details ==
All of the processes of Shiina esterification consist of reversible reactions, with the exception of the last nucleophilic substitution step with alcohol. Therefore, the aromatic carboxylic acid anhydride and the mixed anhydride (MA) coexist in the system. Furthermore, aliphatic carboxylic acid anhydride produced via disproportionation of the MA is simultaneously present in the system; thus, it is directly used as a mixture without being separated. Owing to activation by Lewis acid catalysts or nucleophilic catalysts, the mixture of these three components begins to react with alcohol; in addition to the targeted aliphatic carboxylic acid esters, aromatic carboxylic acid esters are likely to be formed as by-products.

However, by using 4-trifluoromethylbenzoic anhydride (TFBA) as the aromatic carboxylic acid anhydride under acidic conditions and 2-methyl-6-nitrobenzoic anhydride (MNBA) as the aromatic carboxylic acid anhydride under basic conditions, practically no aromatic carboxylic acid esters are obtained as by-products. (The chemoselectivity is 200:1 or higher.)

Aromatic carboxylic acid anhydrides are used as dehydration condensation agents not only for the intermolecular coupling of carboxylic acids with alcohols but also for the intramolecular cyclization of hydroxycarboxylic acids (Shiina macrolactonization). Both of these intermolecular and intramolecular reactions are used for the artificial synthesis of various natural products and pharmacologically active compounds, as the reaction of a carboxylic acid with an amine produces an amide or a peptide.

In acidic reactions, Lewis acid catalysts, such as metal triflates, exhibit high activities, while in basic reactions, 4-dimethylaminopyridine (DMAP), 4-dimethylaminopyridine N-oxide (DMAPO), and 4-pyrrolidinopyridine (PPY) are employed.

In the Shiina esterification performed under basic conditions, asymmetric synthesis is realized using chiral nucleophilic catalysts. First, in the presence of a chiral nucleophilic catalyst, by the action of an appropriate carboxylic acid anhydride on a racemic aliphatic carboxylic acid, the corresponding MA is produced, resulting in the kinetic resolution of the racemic aliphatic carboxylic acid after having been subjected to reaction with achiral alcohol. Using this method, optically active carboxylic acids and optically active carboxylic acid esters can be obtained. It is also possible to realize the kinetic resolution of racemic alcohols by modifying the compositions of the reactants, i.e., by forming MA through reactions between achiral carboxylic acid and the appropriate carboxylic acid anhydride; then, by activating the racemic alcohols using the MA, optically active alcohols and optically active carboxylic acid esters can be obtained.

== See also ==
- Shiina macrolactonization
- Fischer–Speier esterification
- Steglich esterification
- Yamaguchi esterification
- Mitsunobu reaction

== External lists ==
- Shiina, I.; Hashizume, M.; Yamai, Y.; Oshiumi, H.; Shimazaki, T.; Takasuna, Y.; Ibuka, R. (2005). "Enantioselective Total Synthesis of Octalactin A Using Asymmetric Aldol Reactions and a Rapid Lactonization To Form a Medium-Sized Ring". Chem. Eur. J. 11 (22): 6601–6608. doi:10.1002/chem.200500417. PMID 16118824.
- Schweitzer, D.; Kane, J. J.; Strand, D.; McHenry, P.; Tenniswood, M.; Helquist, P. (2007). "Total Synthesis of Iejimalide B. An Application of the Shiina Macrolactonization". Org. Lett. 9 (22): 4619–4622. doi:10.1021/ol702129w. PMID 17915890.
- Das, S.; Paul, D.; Goswami, R. K. (2016). "Stereoselective Total Synthesis of Bioactive Marine Natural Product Biselyngbyolide B". Org. Lett. 18 (8): 1908–1911. doi:10.1021/acs.orglett.6b00713. PMID 27043308.
- M. W. Chojnacka, R. A. Batey (2018). "Total Synthesis of (+)-Prunustatin A: Utility of Organotrifluoroborate-Mediated Prenylation and Shiina MNBA Esterification and Macrolactonization To Avoid a Competing Thorpe–Ingold Effect Accelerated Transesterification". Org. Lett. 20 (18): 5671–5675. doi:10.1021/acs.orglett.8b02396. PMID 30160125.
- Xu, S.; Held, I.; Kempf, B.; Mayr, H.; Steglich, W.; Zipse, H. (2005). "The DMAP-Catalyzed Acetylation of Alcohols—A Mechanistic Study (DMAP = 4-(Dimethylamino)pyridine)". Chem. Eur. J. 11 (16): 4751–4757. doi:10.1002/chem.200500398. PMID 15924289.
