= 2-Methyl-6-nitrobenzoic anhydride =

Names
- Preferred IUPAC name 2-Methyl-6-nitrobenzoic anhydride

Identifiers
CAS Number	434935-69-0
3D model (JSmol)	Interactive image
ChemSpider	8648059
ECHA InfoCard	100.156.789
PubChem CID	10472648
UNII	EC8MK6FE8B
CompTox Dashboard (EPA)	DTXSID60440549
- InChI: InChI=1S/C16H12N2O7/c1-9-5-3-7-11(17(21)22)13(9)15(19)25-16(20)14-10(2)6-4-8-12(14)18(23)24/h3-8H,1-2H3 Key: YEKPNMQQSPHKBP-UHFFFAOYSA-N; InChI=1/C16H12N2O7/c1-9-5-3-7-11(17(21)22)13(9)15(19)25-16(20)14-10(2)6-4-8-12(14)18(23)24/h3-8H,1-2H3 Key: YEKPNMQQSPHKBP-UHFFFAOYAB
- SMILES: CC1=C(C(=CC=C1)[N+](=O)[O-])C(=O)OC(=O)C2=C(C=CC=C2[N+](=O)[O-])C

Properties
Chemical formula	C_{16}H_{12}N_{2}O_{7}
Molar mass	344.279 g·mol^{−1}
- Except where otherwise noted, data are given for materials in their standard state (at 25 °C [77 °F], 100 kPa). Infobox references

2-Methyl-6-nitrobenzoic anhydride is an organic acid anhydride also known as the Shiina reagent, having a structure wherein carboxylic acids undergo intermolecular dehydration condensation. It was developed in 2002 by Prof. Isamu Shiina (Tokyo University of Science, Japan). The compound is often abbreviated MNBA.

== Abstract ==
The reagent is used for synthetic reactions wherein medium- and large-sized lactones are formed from hydroxycarboxylic acids via intramolecular ring closure (Shiina macrolactonization). The reaction proceeds at room temperature under basic or neutral conditions. This reagent can be used not only for macrolactonization but also for esterification, amidation, and peptide coupling.

== See also ==
- Condensation reaction
- Fischer-Speier esterification
- Mitsunobu reaction
- Shiina esterification
- Steglich esterification
- Yamaguchi esterification
