= Shiina macrolactonization =

Shiina macrolactonization (or Shiina lactonization) is an organic chemical reaction that synthesizes cyclic compounds by using aromatic carboxylic acid anhydrides as dehydration condensation agents. In 1994, Prof. Isamu Shiina (Tokyo University of Science, Japan) reported an acidic cyclization method using Lewis acid catalyst, and, in 2002, a basic cyclization using nucleophilic catalyst.

== Mechanism ==
The slow addition of hydroxycarboxylic acids (seco acids) into a system containing aromatic carboxylic acid anhydride and catalyst produces corresponding lactones (cyclic esters) through the process shown in the following figure. In acidic Shiina macrolactonization, Lewis acid catalysts are used, while nucleophilic catalysts are used for Shiina macrolactonization under basic conditions.

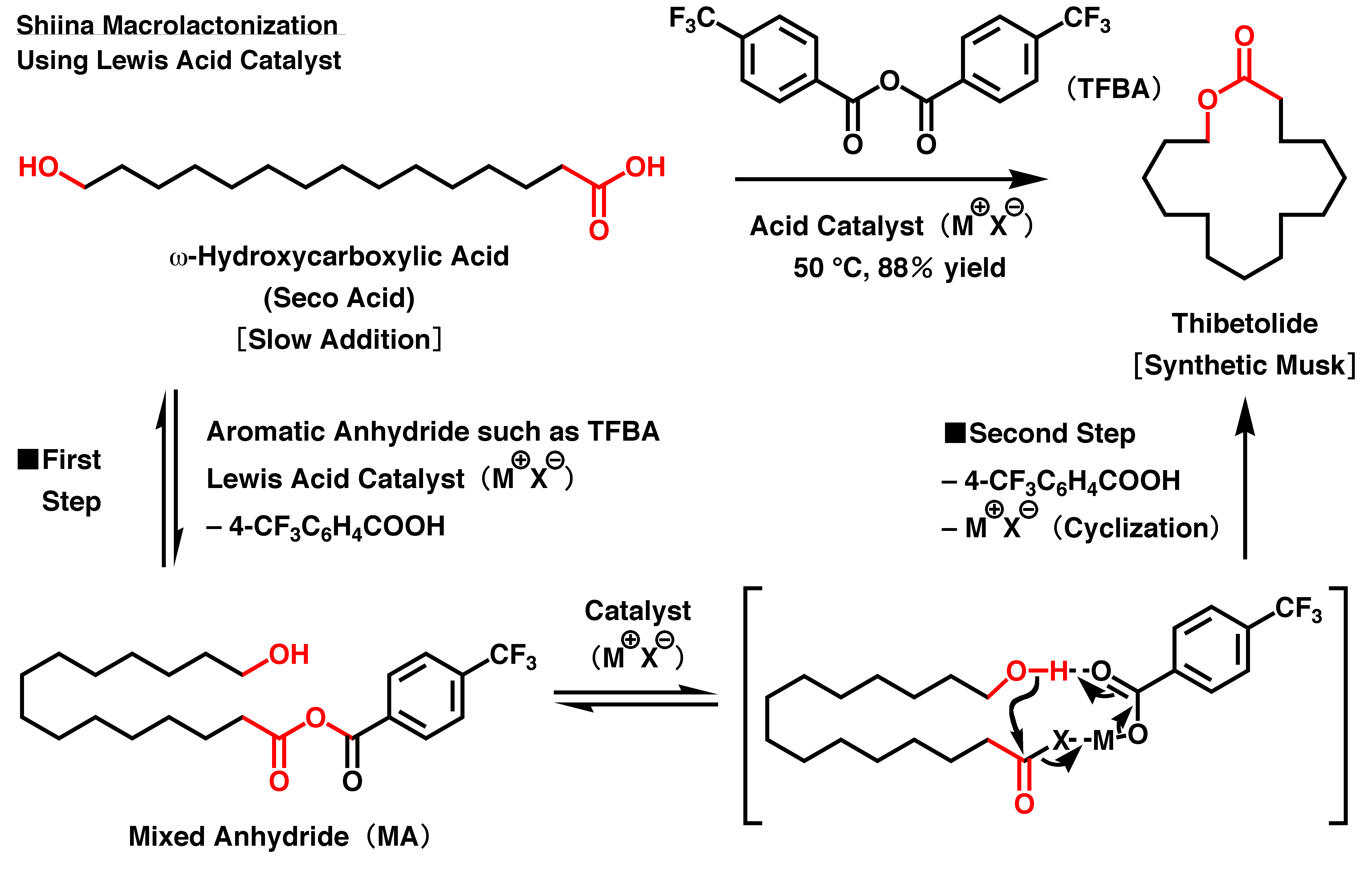
Shiina macrolactonization using Lewis acid catalyst

In the acidic reaction, 4-trifluoromethylbenzoic anhydride (TFBA) is mainly used as a dehydration condensation agent. First, the Lewis acid catalyst activates the TFBA, and then a carboxyl group in seco acid reacts with the activated TFBA to produce mixed anhydride (MA) once. Then, a carbonyl group derived from the seco acid in MA is selectively activated and is attacked by a hydroxyl group in the seco acid through intramolecular nucleophilic substitution. Simultaneously, residual aromatic carboxylic acid salt, which is derived from the MA, acts as a deprotonation agent, causing the cyclization to progress and produce the desired lactone. To balance the reaction, each TFBA accepts the atoms of one water molecule from its starting material, i.e., the hydroxycarboxylic acid, and then changes itself into two molecules of 4-trifluoromethylbenzoic acid at the end of the reaction. Since the Lewis acid catalyst is reproduced at the end of the reaction, only a small proportion of catalyst is needed relative to the starting material to drive the reaction forward.

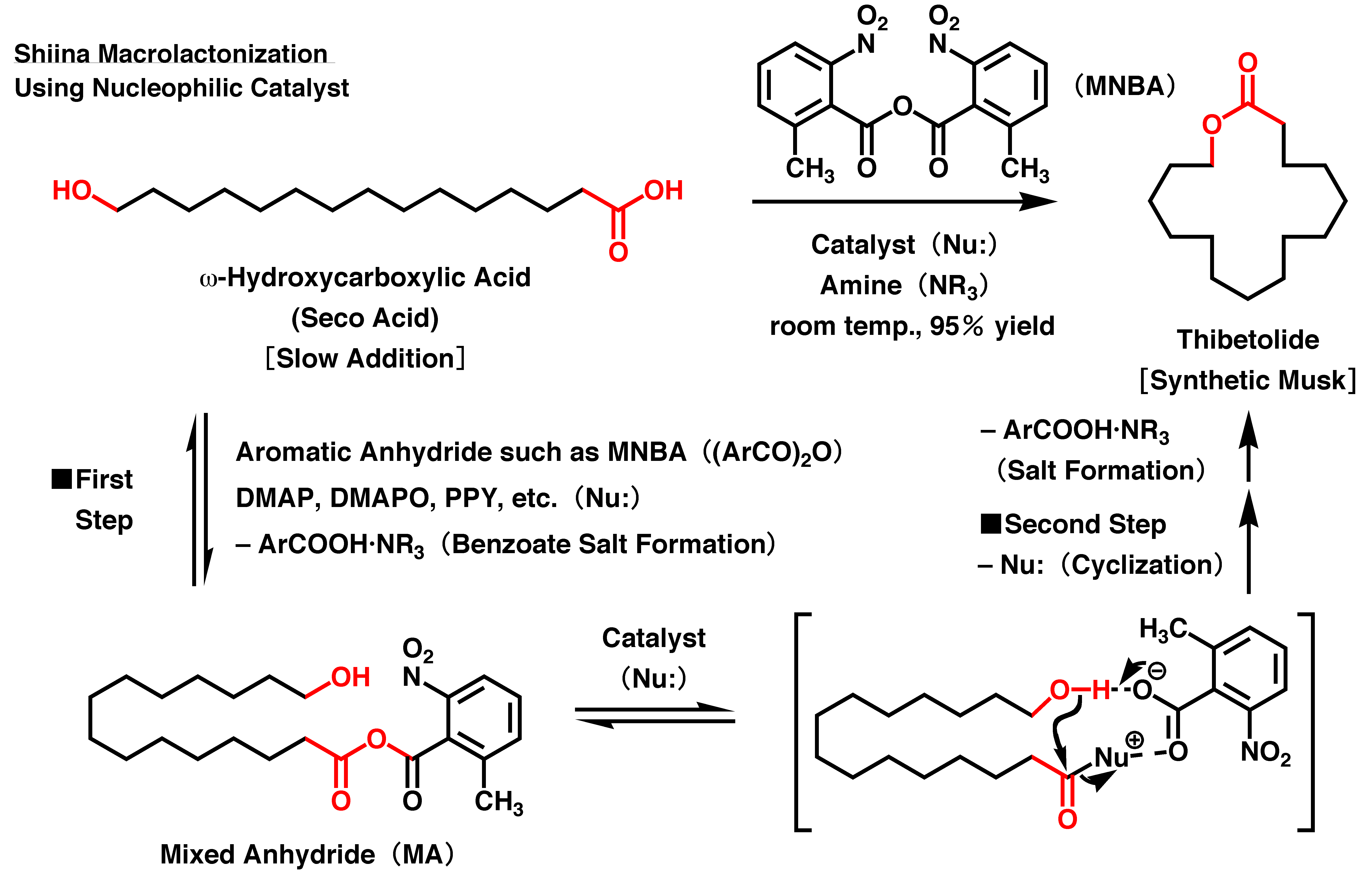
Shiina Macrolactonization using nucleophilic catalyst

In the basic reaction, 2-methyl-6-nitrobenzoic anhydride (MNBA) is primarily used as a dehydration condensation agent. First, the nucleophilic catalyst acts on the MNBA to produce activated acyl carboxylate. The reaction of carboxyl group in the seco acid with the activated acyl carboxylate produces the corresponding MA, in the same manner as in the acidic reaction. Then, the nucleophilic catalyst acts selectively on a carbonyl group derived from the seco acid in MA to again produce activated acyl carboxylate. The hydroxyl group in the seco acid attacks its host molecule through intramolecular nucleophilic substitution, and at the same time, carboxylate anion, derived from 2-methyl-6-nitrobenzoic acid, acts as a deprotonation agent, promoting the progression of the cyclization and producing the desired lactone. To balance the reaction, each MNBA accepts the atoms of one water molecule from its starting material, changing itself into two molecules of the amine salt of 2-methyl-6-nitrobenzoic acid, and thus, terminating the reaction. Because the nucleophilic catalyst is reproduced at the end of the reaction, only small stoichiometric quantities are required.

== Details ==
All of the processes of Shiina macrolactonization consist of reversible reactions, with the exception of the last cyclization step. At the first stage of the reaction, mixed anhydride (MA) is produced quickly under mild conditions; at the second stage, a faster cyclization of the MA prevents an increase in MA concentration. To maximize this concentration gradient effect, the starting material, i.e., hydroxycarboxylic acid (seco acid), is fed slowly into the system with a syringe driver. When seco acid is added into the system little by little using a syringe driver, all of the reactant is quickly converted into MA; then, the MA is immediately consumed by the cyclization reaction. As just described, MA concentration is kept low throughout the Shiina macrolactonization reaction. Therefore, the monomer production rate is very high.

Aromatic carboxylic acid anhydrides are used as dehydration condensation agents not only for the intramolecular reaction of hydroxycarboxylic acids but also for the intermolecular reaction of carboxylic acids with alcohols (Shiina esterification). Both of these intramolecular and intermolecular reactions are used for the artificial synthesis of various natural products and pharmacologically active compounds, as the reaction of a carboxylic acid with an amine produces an amide or a peptide.

In acidic reactions, Lewis acid catalysts, such as metal triflates, exhibit high activities, while in basic reactions, 4-dimethylaminopyridine (DMAP), 4-dimethylaminopyridine N-oxide (DMAPO), and 4-pyrrolidinopyridine (PPY) are employed.

== See also ==
- Shiina esterification
- Fischer-Speier esterification
- Steglich esterification
- Yamaguchi esterification
- Mitsunobu reaction
