= Propyl gallate =

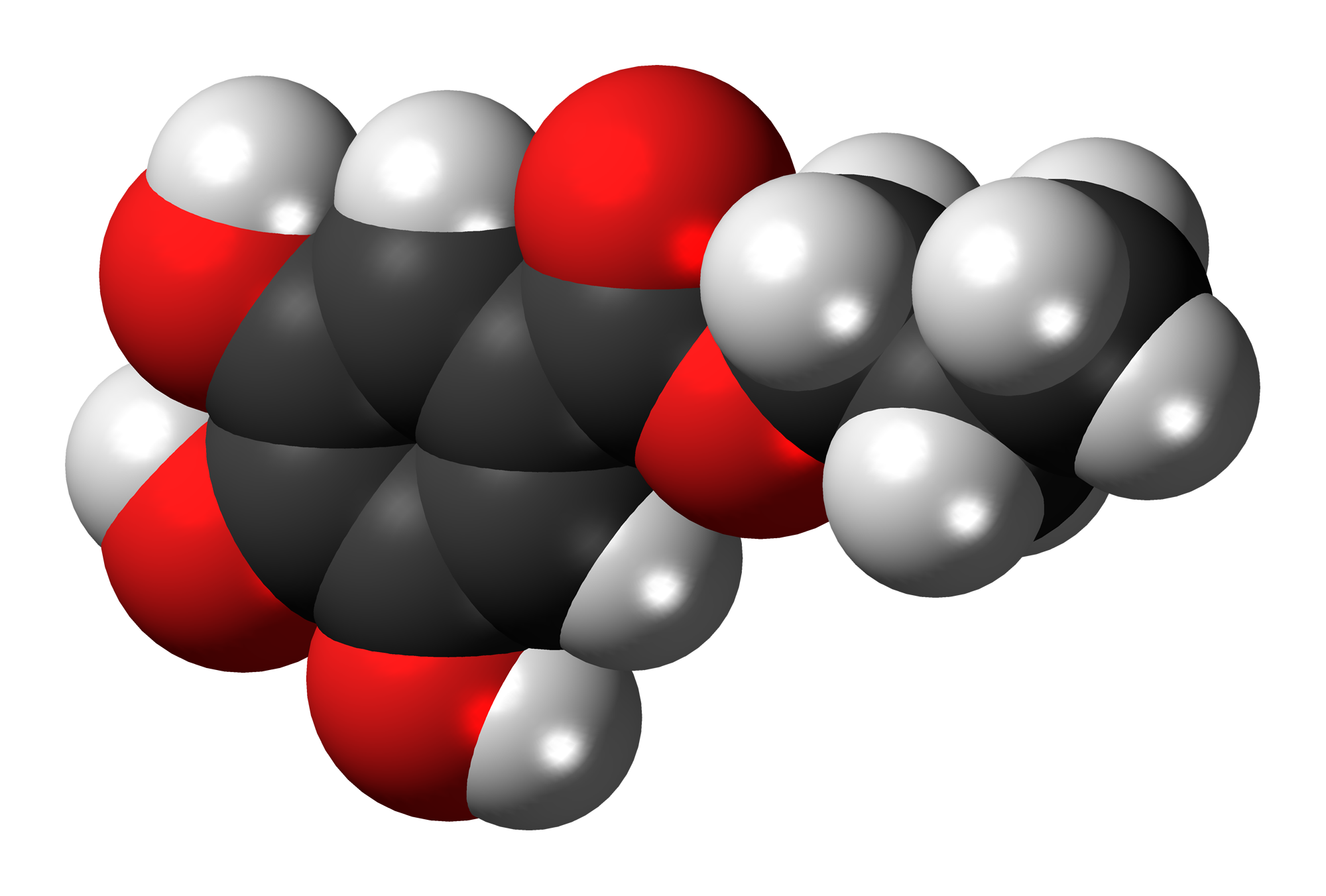

Names
- IUPAC name Propyl 3,4,5-trihydroxybenzoate
- Other names Gallic acid, propyl ester n-Propyl gallate E310

Identifiers
CAS Number	121-79-9
3D model (JSmol)	Interactive image
ChEMBL	ChEMBL7983
ChemSpider	4778
ECHA InfoCard	100.004.090
EC Number	204-498-2
E number	E310 (antioxidants, ...)
MeSH	Propyl+Gallate
PubChem CID	4947
UNII	8D4SNN7V92
CompTox Dashboard (EPA)	DTXSID5021201
- InChI: InChI=1S/C10H12O5/c1-2-3-15-10(14)6-4-7(11)9(13)8(12)5-6/h4-5,11-13H,2-3H2,1H3 Key: ZTHYODDOHIVTJV-UHFFFAOYSA-N; InChI=1/C10H12O5/c1-2-3-15-10(14)6-4-7(11)9(13)8(12)5-6/h4-5,11-13H,2-3H2,1H3 Key: ZTHYODDOHIVTJV-UHFFFAOYAT
- SMILES: O=C(OCCC)c1cc(O)c(O)c(O)c1

Properties
Chemical formula	C_{10}H_{12}O_{5}
Molar mass	212.20 g/mol
Appearance	White crystalline powder
Melting point	150 °C (302 °F; 423 K)
Boiling point	Decomposes
- Except where otherwise noted, data are given for materials in their standard state (at 25 °C [77 °F], 100 kPa). verify (what is ?) Infobox references

Propyl gallate, or propyl 3,4,5-trihydroxybenzoate, is an ester formed by the condensation of gallic acid and propanol. Since 1948, this antioxidant has been added to foods containing oils and fats to prevent oxidation. As a food additive, it is used under the E number E310.

== Description ==
Propyl gallate is an antioxidant. It protects against oxidation by hydrogen peroxide and oxygen free radicals. It appears as a white to creamy-white crystalline odorless solid.

Propyl gallate (PG) is a white to nearly white odorless crystalline powder that has slightly bitter taste and darkens in the presence of iron salts. It is an irritant that can cause skin dryness, dermatitis, and sensitization.

== Production ==
Propyl gallate does not occur naturally, and is prepared either from reactions with gallic acid and 1-propanol, or by enzyme catalysis of tannic acid. Syntheses with gallic acid have been the most prominent methods of production, and include Steglich esterification with N,N'-diisopropylcarbodiimide and 4-dimethylaminopyridine, anhydrous addition of thionyl chloride, and Fischer esterification with various catalysts.

== Uses ==
Propyl gallate is used to protect oils and fats in products from oxidation; which can be useful for foods, cosmetics, hair products, adhesives, biodiesel, and lubricants. It is often used interchangeably with octyl gallate and dodecyl gallate in biodiesel and lubricant applications.

Propyl gallate is an antioxidant that neutralizes free radicals, which are unstable molecules that can damage cells, proteins, and DNA. It is used as a triplet state quencher and an antioxidant in fluorescence microscopy.

== Biological effects ==
A 1993 study in fat rodents found little or no effect on carcinogenesis by propyl gallate.

A 2009 study found that propyl gallate acts as an estrogen antagonist.

Propyl gallate has many biological activities, including:

- Enzyme inhibition
- Antimicrobial activity
- Inhibition of nitrosamine formation
- Anticarcinogenesis
- Antitumorigenesis
- Anesthesia
- Anti-nociceptive
- Inhibition of biosynthetic processes
- Ionizing/ultraviolet (UV) radiation protection

== Safety ==
- Propyl gallate is an irritant to the skin and eyes, and it can be inhaled. Some studies have reported that propyl gallate is toxic, while others have reported therapeutic benefits.
- The FDA recognizes propyl gallate as being generally safe, but in other countries, it's either been used on a very limited basis or completely banned. This is because some preliminary studies have suggested that propyl gallate may cause cancer (in several organs) in rats and be an endocrine disrupter.
