= C9H12N2 =

The molecular formula C_{9}H_{12}N_{2} (molar mass: 148.20 g/mol, exact mass: 148.1000 u) may refer to:

- Nornicotine, also known as demethylnicotine
- 4-Pyrrolidinylpyridine
