= Jason Sello =

American chemist

Jason Kelby Sello
- Education: Harvard University; Morehouse College
- Scientific career
- Workplaces: Brown University; Harvard Medical School; John Innes Centre
- Thesis: Use of conformational analysis as a design element in diversity-oriented organic synthesis (2002)

Jason Kelby Sello is an American chemist who is a professor of pharmaceutical chemistry at the University of California, San Francisco. His research looks to develop antibacterial agents and technologies for bioenergy. In 2020, he was named by Cell Press as one of 1000 inspiring Black scientists in America.

== Early life and education ==
Sello earned his bachelor's degree in biology at Morehouse College. He was an ARCS Foundation scholar at Morehouse. He moved to Harvard University in 1997 to start his doctoral research, where he concentrated on organic synthesis in the laboratory of Stuart Schreiber. After graduating, he joined Christopher T. Walsh at the Harvard Medical School. Together they worked on enzymology, the study of biological catalysts. He also worked as a postdoctoral researcher at the John Innes Centre, where he investigated the genetics of streptomyces with Mark Buttner.

== Research and career ==
Sello combines chemistry, biochemistry and genetics to better understand biological phenomena. He looks to use this information to develop new therapeutic strategies for neurological conditions. He started his independent career as an assistant professor at Brown University in 2006 and was promoted to associate professor in 2012. In 2013 he was made a Martin Luther King Jr. visiting associate professor at the Massachusetts Institute of Technology. At MIT, he worked with Robert T. Sauer on antibacterial agents that can impede protein turnover in bacteria.

Sello has developed antibacterial drugs based on cyclic acyldepsipeptides. These cyclic acyldepsipeptides are produced by different species of bacteria in soil and used to defend against competing bacteria. They target the caseinolytic protease proteolytic subunit (ClpP), which was not possible with any drugs on the market at the time, and may serve as a treatment for tuberculosis.

Sello delivered the inaugural National Organization for the Professional Advancement of Black Chemists and Chemical Engineers (NOBCChE) lecture at the University of Pennsylvania in 2014. In 2017 he received support from the Chan Zuckerberg Initiative, and was appointed to their board of directors. In 2019, Sello delivered the Lloyd Noel Ferguson lecture at California State University. The lecture series honours Lloyd Noel Ferguson, an educator and researcher who established the first doctoral program in chemistry at historically black colleges and universities whilst a professor at Howard University. Sello was named by Cell Press as one of 1000 inspirational Black scientists in America in 2020.

== Selected publications ==
- L E Quadri; J Sello; T A Keating; Paul H. Weinreb; C T Walsh (1 November 1998). "Identification of a Mycobacterium tuberculosis gene cluster encoding the biosynthetic enzymes for assembly of the virulence-conferring siderophore mycobactin". Chemistry and Biology. 5 (11): 631–645. doi:10.1016/s1074-5521(98)90291-5. ISSN 1074-5521. PMID 9831524. Wikidata Q28486708.
- Lee D; Sello JK; Schreiber SL (1 March 2000). "Pairwise use of complexity-generating reactions in diversity-oriented organic synthesis". Organic Letters. 2 (5): 709–712. doi:10.1021/ol005574n. ISSN 1523-7060. PMID 10814416. Wikidata Q52116055.
- Jason K. Sello; Peter R. Andreana; Daesung Lee; Stuart L. Schreiber (1 October 2003). "Stereochemical control of skeletal diversity". Organic Letters. 5 (22): 4125–4127. doi:10.1021/ol035773h. ISSN 1523-7060. PMC 4134662. PMID 14572265. Wikidata Q34052406.
