= Wolfgang Steglich =

German chemist (born 1933)

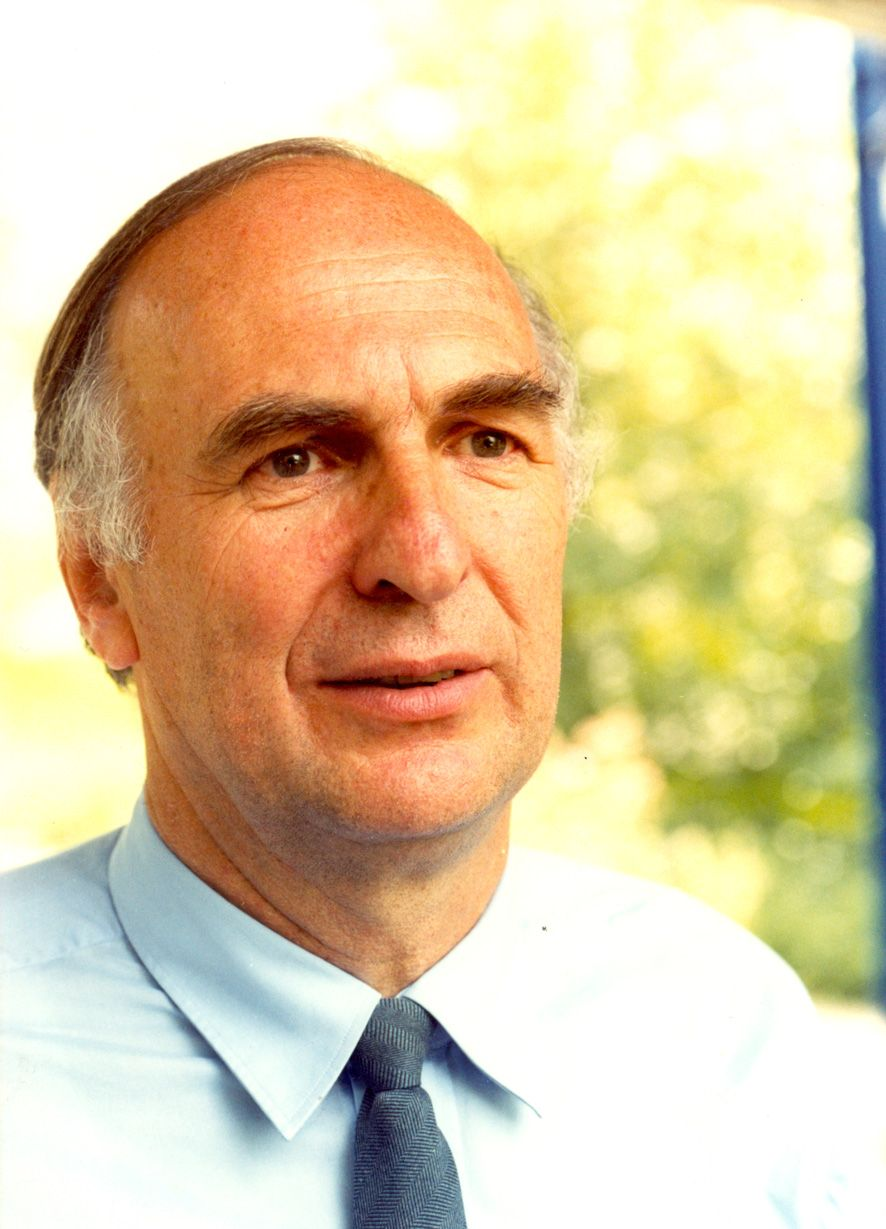
- Wolfgang Steglich
- Born: 12 August 1933 (age 93); Kamenz, Germany
- Education: Technical University of Munich
- Known for: Natural products chemistry, 4-dimethylaminopyridine (DMAP), Strobilurins
- Awards: 1986 Emil Fischer medal, Society of German Chemists; 1989 Adolf Windaus medal, University of Göttingen; 1996 Honorary Professor of the Shanghai Institute of Materia Medica, Chinese Academy of Sciences; 1996 Karl Heinz Beckurts award together with Prof. Dr. Timm Anke; 1997 Richard Kuhn medal, Society of German Chemists; 1998 honorary degree, Humboldt University of Berlin; 2000 Federal Cross of Merit on Ribbon.
- Scientific career
- Fields: Organic chemistry, natural products chemistry, fungal secondary metabolites
- Workplaces: Technical University of Munich (1958-1960), Imperial College London (1961), Technical University of Munich (1962-1971), Technische Universität Berlin (1971-1975), University of Bonn (1975-1991), LMU Munich (1991-2001)
- Doctoral advisor: Friedrich Weygand

Wolfgang Steglich (born 12 August 1933) is a German chemist.

== Life ==
Wolfgang Steglich was born in Kamenz and studied chemistry at Technische Universität Berlin and later at the Technical University of Munich where he received his PhD in 1960 for work with Friedrich Weygand. Following a postdoc stay with Sir Derek H. R. Barton at the Imperial College London, Wolfgang Steglich completed his habilitation at the Technical University of Munich. After Weygand's death in 1969, Steglich was in charge of the Weygand chair until he became a full professor at Technische Universität Berlin in 1971. In 1975, he was appointed a professorship at the University of Bonn. He succeeded Rolf Huisgen as head of the organic chemistry department of LMU Munich in 1991. Wolfgang Steglich retired in 2001.

== Work ==
The use of 4-dimethylaminopyridine for esterifications with anhydrides, which is sometimes called the Steglich esterification, his studies on the metabolism of fungi, and, in collaboration with Timm Anke, the structure elucidation and chemical synthesis of the antifungal Strobilurins that resulted in the industrial development of the novel class of Strobilurin-based crop protection agents are his main contributions in the field of chemistry.

== Literature ==
- Klaus Roth (2015). "Pilzragout nach Chemiker Art". Chemie in unserer Zeit. 49 (3): 196–212. doi:10.1002/ciuz.201500712.
- Jeffrey I. Seeman (2017). "R. B. Woodward's Letters: Revealing, Elegant and Commanding". Helvetica Chimica Acta. 100 (12) e1700183. doi:10.1002/hlca.201700183.
