= Tokyo University of Science =

Private university in Japan

- Motto: An educational foundation for the development of the nation through the advancement of science
- Type: Private
- Established: 1881
- Affiliations: JUNBA, MANA, K2K experiment
- President: Yoichiro Matsumoto
- Students: 19,673
- Undergraduates: 16,518
- Postgraduates: 2,910
- Other students: 245
- Location: Shinjuku, Tokyo, Japan; 35°41′58″N 139°44′29″E
- Campus: Urban: -Kagurazaka main campus -Katsushika campus -Noda campus -Oshamambe campus
- Mascots: Bocchan; Madonnachan
- Website: www.tus.ac.jp/en

- Location within Special wards of Tokyo Location within Japan

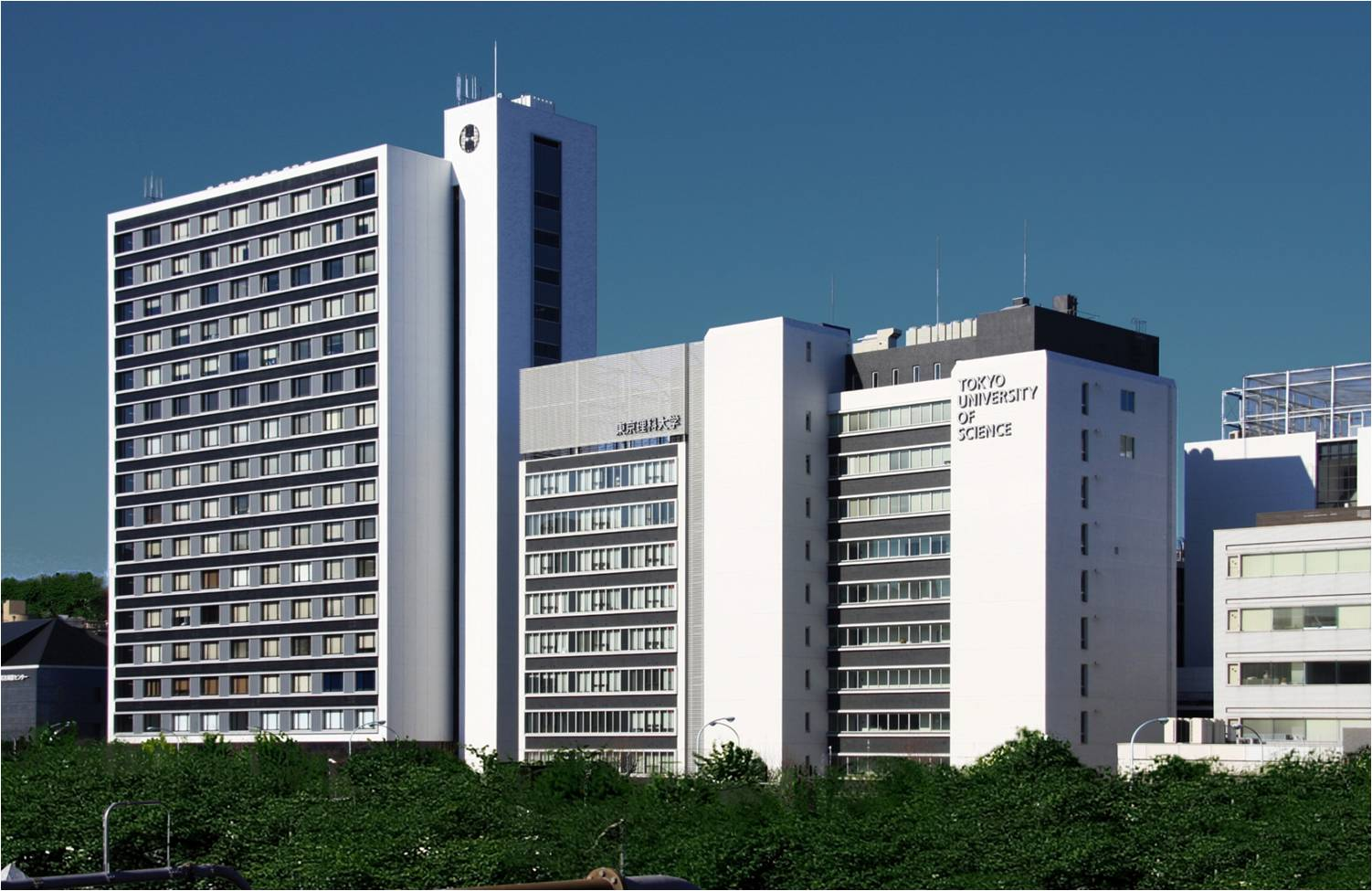
Tokyo University of Science, Kagurazaka Campus

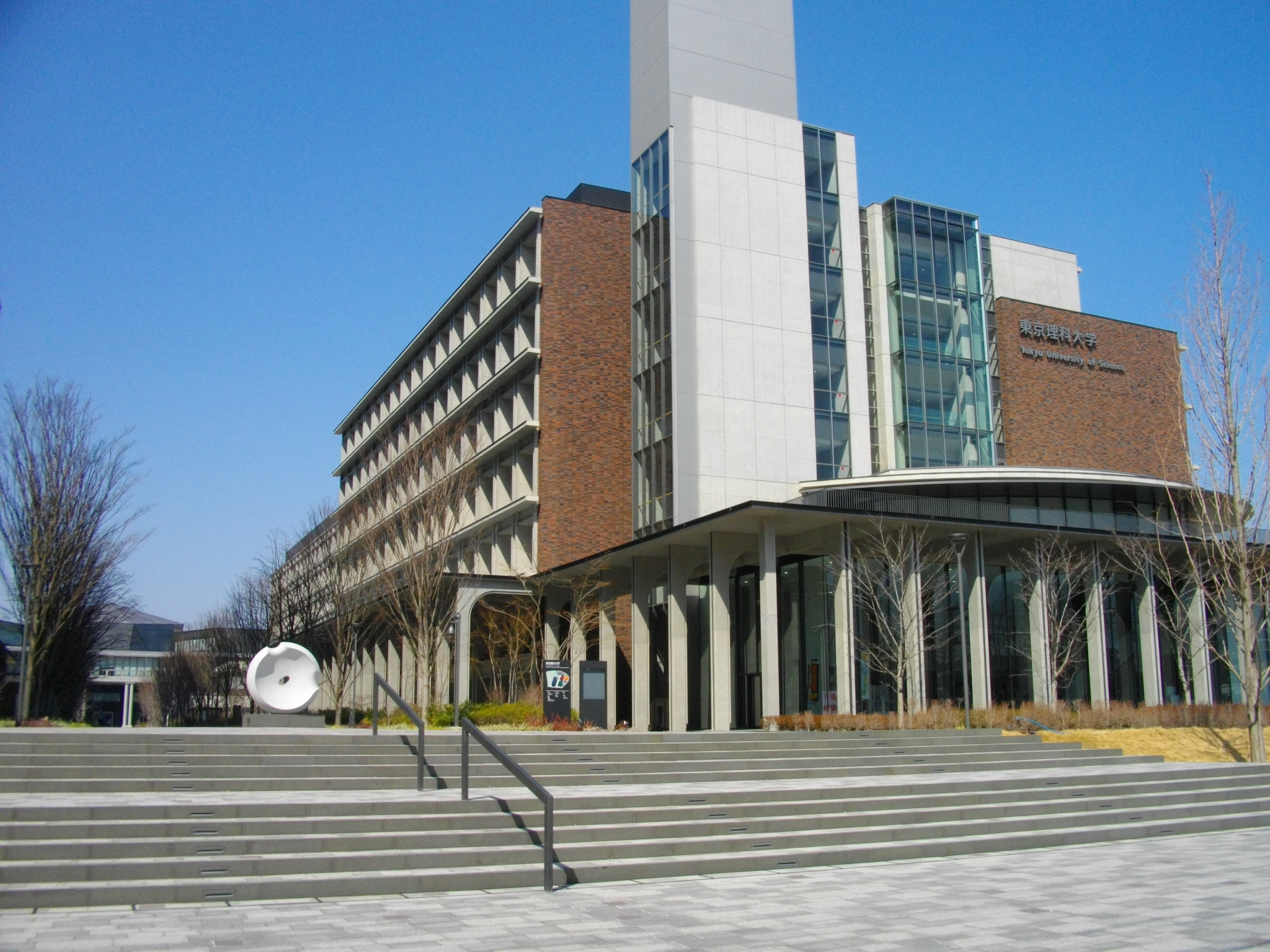
Tokyo University of Science, Katsushika Campus

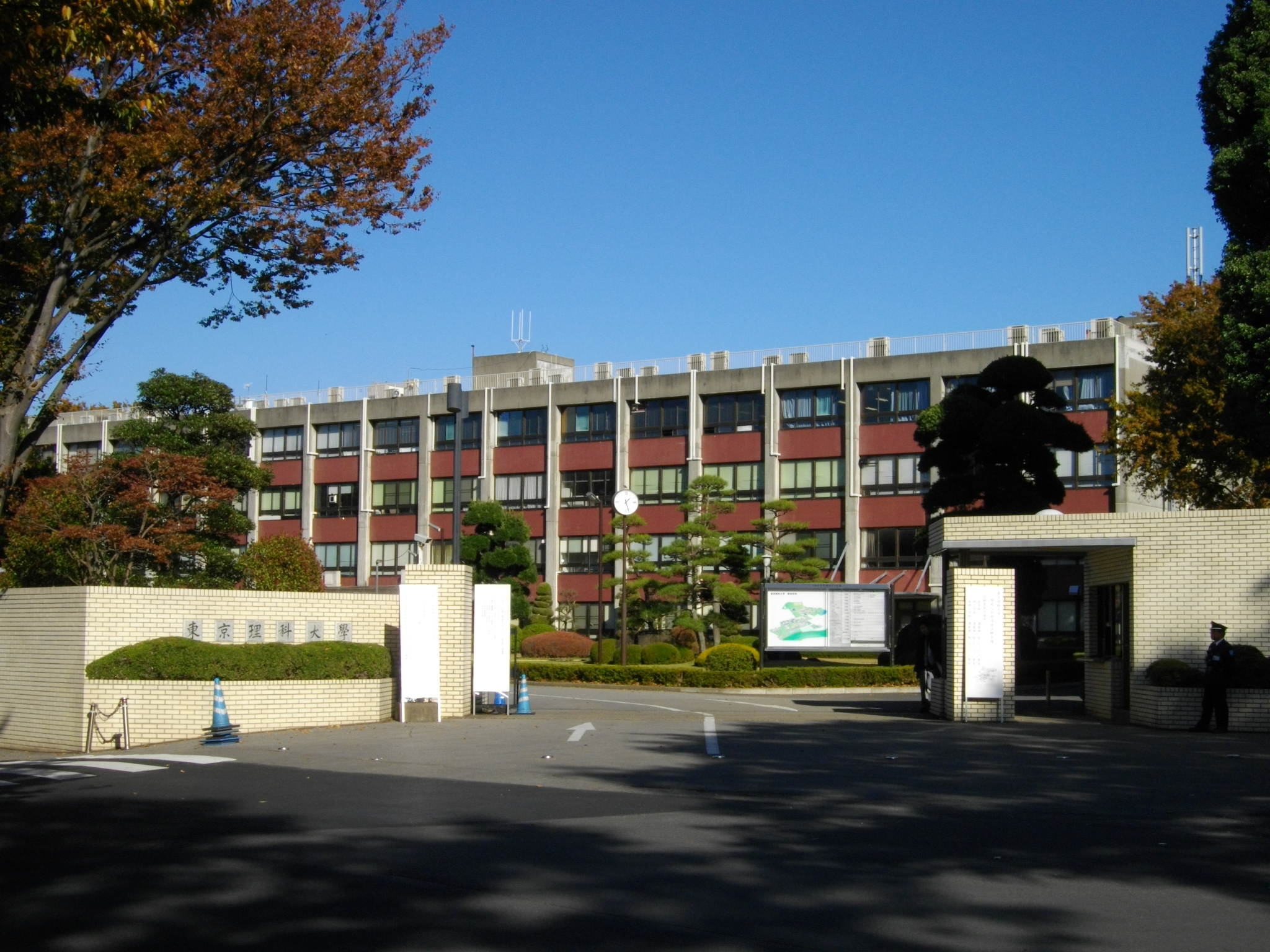
Tokyo University of Science, Noda Campus

Tokyo University of Science (東京理科大学, Tōkyō Rika Daigaku), formerly "Science University of Tokyo" or TUS, informally Rikadai (理科大) or simply Ridai (理大) is a private research university located in Shinjuku, Tokyo, Japan.

== History ==
Tokyo University of Science was founded in 1881 as The Tokyo Academy of Physics by 21 graduates of the Department of Physics in the Faculty of Science, University of Tokyo. In 1883, it was renamed the Tokyo College of Science, and in 1949, it attained university status and became the Tokyo University of Science. The leading character appearing in Japanese novelist Soseki Natsume's novel Botchan graduated from Tokyo University of Science.

== Academic rankings ==
=== Global university rankings ===
Academic Ranking of World Universities ranked Tokyo University of Science in equal 13th place in Japan.

=== Graduate school rankings ===
Eduniversal ranked Tokyo University of Science second in its rankings of "Top business school with significant international influence" in Japan.

=== Alumni rankings ===
In Times Higher Education ranking of CEOs of the world's largest enterprises, it is ranked third for Japanese universities.

== Campuses ==
Tokyo University of Science main campus is located in the Kagurazaka district of Shinjuku. The nearest station is Iidabashi Station.

Apart from the main campus in Shinjuku, there are other campuses around the country:

- Kagurazaka (Main) Campus: Shinjuku
- Fujimi school building: Chiyoda-ku, Tokyo
- Katsushika Campus: Katsushika-ku, Tokyo
- Noda Campus: Noda, Chiba
- Oshamambe Campus: Oshamambe, Hokkaido

== Facilities ==
=== Libraries ===
Tokyo University of Science has libraries in four different areas: Kagurazaka, Noda, Katsushika and Oshamambe.

- Kagurazaka Library
- Noda Library
- Katsushika Library
- Oshamambe Library

=== Museum and other facilities ===
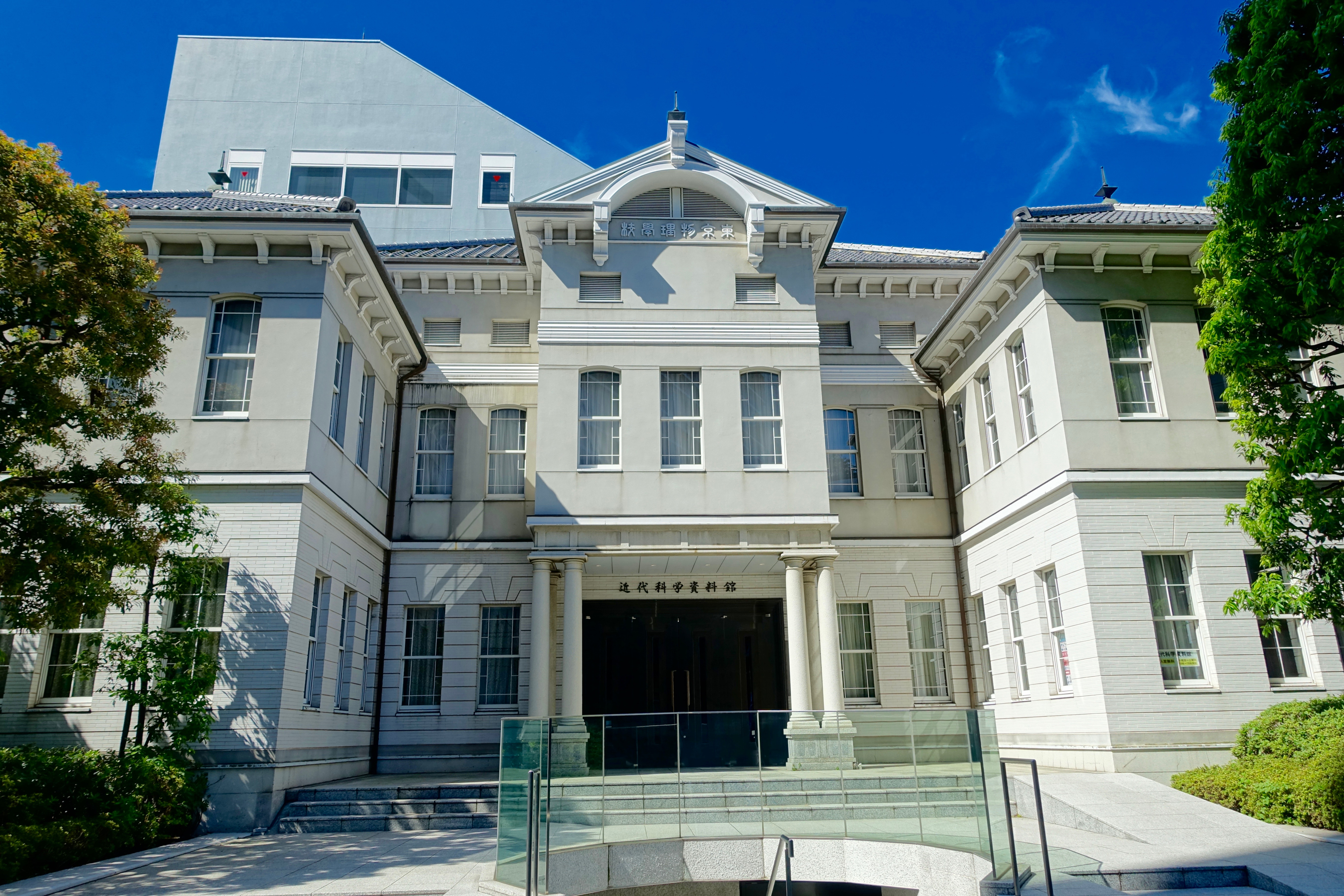
Science and Technology Museum

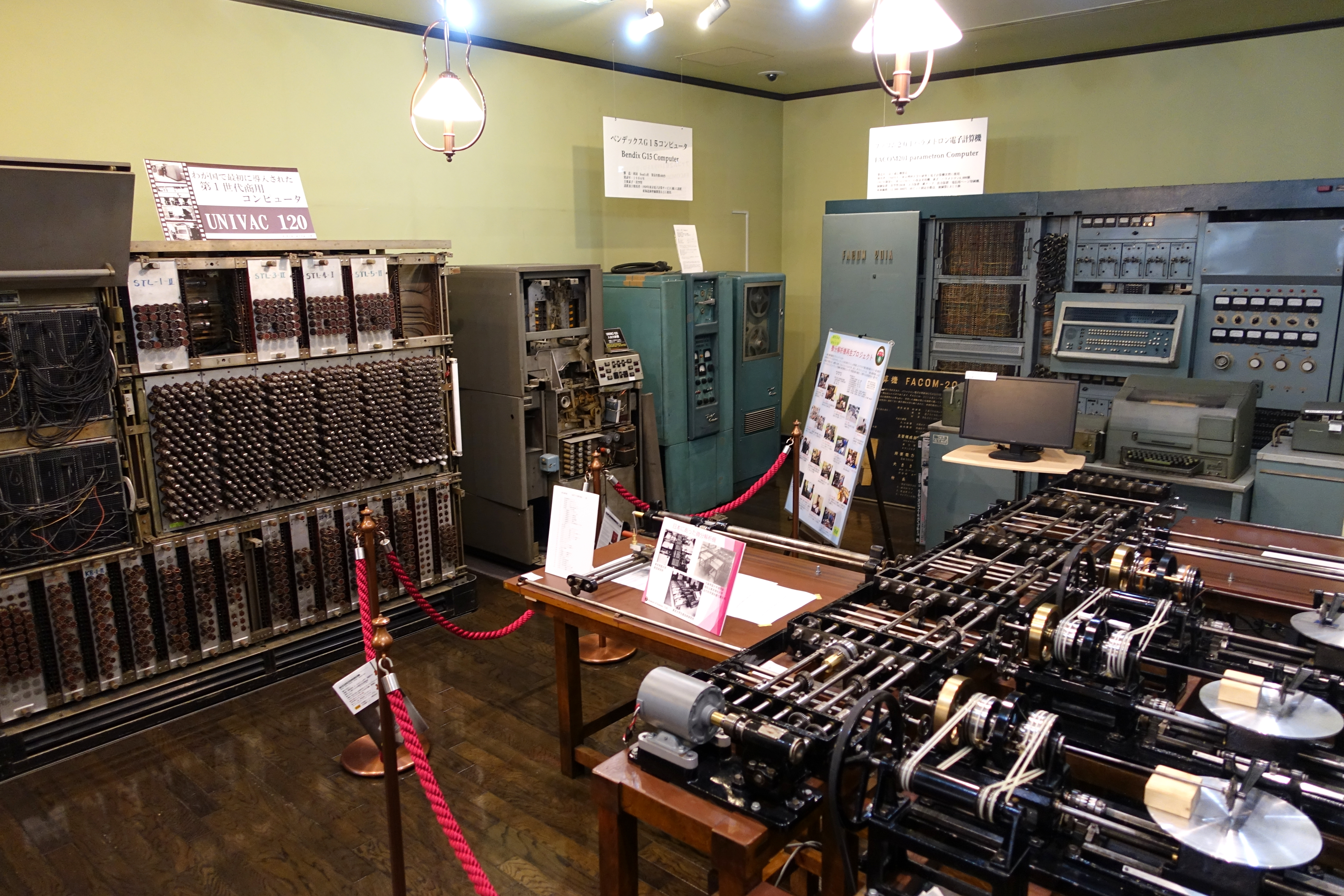
Interior view with early computers - Science and Technology Museum

Other libraries on Tokyo University of Science campuses include:

- Science and Technology Museum
- Athletic Facilities
- Seminar House
- Training Center
- Morito Memorial Hall

== Undergraduate and graduate schools ==
=== Undergraduate schools ===
There are abbreviations for each department, and most of them are set based on these English names. For example, like Department of Architecture in Faculty of Engineering becomes "A", and Department of Applied Electronics in Faculty of Advanced Engineering becomes "AE". In contrast, abbreviations for just Faculty of Science are set based on these Japanese names: Department of Mathematics, in Japanese, "Sugaku-ka" becomes "S", and Department of Applied Mathematics, in Japanese, "Ouyou-Sugaku-ka" becomes "OS". Here are all faculties, departments, and abbreviations respectively.

- Faculty of Science Division I (Day division)
  - Department of Mathematics ( S )
  - Department of Physics ( B )
  - Department of Chemistry ( K )
  - Department of Applied Mathematics ( OS )
  - Department of Applied Physics (Reorganization) ( OB )
  - Department of Applied Chemistry ( OK )
  - Department of Science Communication ( KK )
- Faculty of Engineering
  - Department of Architecture ( A )
  - Department of Industrial Chemistry ( C )
  - Department of Electrical Engineering ( E )
  - Department of Information and Computer Technology ( I )
  - Department of Mechanical Engineering ( M )
- Faculty of Pharmaceutical Sciences
  - Department of Pharmacy (6-year system) ( YP )
  - Department of Medicinal and Life Sciences (4-year system) ( YM )
- Faculty of Science and Technology
  - Department of Mathematics ( MA )
  - Department of Physics and Astronomy ( PH )
  - Department of Information Science (Reorganization) ( IS )
  - Department of Applied Biological Science ( BS )
  - Department of Architecture ( AR )
  - Department of Pure and Applied Chemistry ( CA )
  - Department of Electrical Engineering ( EE )
  - Department of Industrial and System Engineering ( IE )
  - Department of Mechanical and Aerospace Engineering ( ME )
  - Department of Civil Engineering ( CV )
- Faculty of Information Science and Technology
  - Department of Information Science and Technology ( IST )
- Faculty of Advanced Engineering
  - Department of Applied Electronics ( AE )
  - Department of Material Science and Technology ( AM )
  - Department of Biological Science and Technology ( AB )
  - Department of Applied Physics ( AP )
  - Department of Medical and Robotic Engineering Design ( AD )
- School of Management
  - Department of Management ( MS )
  - Department of Business Economics ( BE )
  - Department of International Design Management ( IDM )
- Faculty of Science Division II (Night division)
  - Department of Mathematics ( II S )
  - Department of Physics ( II B )
  - Department of Chemistry ( II K )

=== Graduate schools ===
- Graduate School of Science
  - Department of Mathematics
  - Department of Physics
  - Department of Chemistry
  - Department of Applied Mathematics
  - Department of Applied Physics (Reorganization)
  - Department of Mathematics and Science Education
- Graduate School of Engineering
  - Department of Architecture
  - Department of Industrial Chemistry
  - Department of Electrical Engineering
  - Department of Information and Computer Technology
  - Department of Mechanical Engineering
- Graduate School of Pharmaceutical Sciences
  - Department of Pharmaceutical Sciences
  - Department of Pharmacoscience
- Graduate School of Science and Technology
  - Department of Mathematics
  - Department of Physics and Astronomy
  - Department of Information Science
  - Department of Applied Biological Science
  - Department of Architecture
  - Department of Pure and Applied Chemistry
  - Department of Electrical Engineering
  - Department of Industrial and System Engineering
  - Department of Mechanical and Aerospace Engineering
  - Department of Civil Engineering
  - Department of Global Fire Science and Technology
- Graduate School of Advanced Engineering
  - Department of Applied Electronics
  - Department of Material Science and Technology
  - Department of Biological Science and Technology
  - Department of Applied Physics
  - Department of Medical and Robotic Engineering Design
- Graduate School of Management
  - Department of Management
  - Department of Management of Technology (MOT)
- Graduate School of Biological Sciences
  - Department of Biological Sciences

=== Special Training Course for Teachers ===
- Division of Mathematics

=== Research institutes ===
University rankings

Regional – Overall
- QS Asia: =175 (2025)

- University Research Administration Center
  - Planning and Management Division
  - Research Strategy Formulation Division
  - Research & Industry University Cooperation Supporting Division
  - Regional Alliance & Commercialization Promotion Division
- Research Institute for Science and Technology
  - Research Centers
    - Center for Fire Science and Technology
    - IR FEL Research Center
    - Research Center for Chirality
    - Photocatalysis International Research Center
    - Translational Research Center
    - Imaging Frontier Center
    - Water Frontier Science & Technology Research Center
    - Research Center for Space Colony
  - Research Divisions
    - Division of Pharmaco-creation Frontier
    - Division of Integrated Science of Oshamambe town
    - Division of Advanced Communication Researches
    - International Research Division of Interfacial Thermo-fluid Dynamics
    - Division of Nanocarbon Research
    - Division of Bio-organometallics
    - Division of Thermoelectric for Waste Heat Recovery
    - Division of Colloid and Interface Science
    - Division of Synergetic Supramolecular Coordination Systems in Multiphase
    - Division of Advanced Urbanism and Architecture
    - Academic Detailing Database Division
    - Division of Medical-Science-Engineering Cooperation
    - Division of Mathematical Modeling and its Mathematical Analysis
    - Water Frontier Science Research Division
    - Fusion of Regenerative Medicine with DDS
    - Photovoltaic Science and Technology Research Division
    - Advanced EC Device Research Division
    - Division of Agri-biotechnology
    - Division of Things and Systems
    - Atmospheric Science Research Division
    - Division of Super Distributed Intelligent Systems
    - Brain Interdisciplinary Research Division
    - Division of Intelligent System Engineering
    - Advanced Agricultural Energy Science and Technology Research Division
  - Joint Usage / Research Center
    - Research Center for Fire Safety Science
    - Photocatalysis International Research Center
- Research Institute for Biomedical Sciences
  - Research Institute Division Groups
    - Division of Immunobiology
    - Division of Molecular Biology
    - Division of Biosignaling
    - Division of Molecular Pathology
    - Division of Development and Aging
    - Division of Experimental Animal Immunology
    - Division of Clinical Research
    - Division of Intramural Cooperation
    - Division of Extramural Cooperation
- Research Equipment Center
- Center for Data Science

== Academic exchange agreements overseas ==
As of 2016, Tokyo University of Science had academic exchange agreements with 75 overseas universities and research institutions, including those between departments and departments.

== Affiliated schools ==
The university has two affiliated four-year universities: Tokyo University of Science, Yamaguchi, in Sanyo-Onoda, Yamaguchi, and Tokyo University of Science, Suwa, in Chino, Nagano.

== Principals, presidents, and chairmen ==
=== Principals ===
- Hisashi Terao, 1883-1896
- Kiyoo Nakamura, 1896–1930
- Kyohei Nakamura, 1930–1934
- Masatoshi Ōkōchi, 1934–1945
- Nakagoro Hirakawa, 1945–1949
- Kotaro Honda, 1949–1951

Concurrently appointed president of Tokyo University of Science.

=== Presidents ===
- Kotaro Honda, 1949–1953
- Masaichi Majima, 1955-1966
- Seishi Kikuchi, 1966-1970
- Masao Kotani, 1970-1982
- Masao Yoshiki, 1982-1990
- Tetsuji Nishikawa, 1990-2001
- Hiroyuki Okamura, 2002-2005
- Shin Takeuchi, 2006-2009
- Akira Fujishima, 2010-2018, discoverer of photocatalyst
- Yoichiro Matsumoto, 2018-

=== Chairmen ===
- Kotaro Honda, 1951–1953
- Nakagoro Hirakawa, 1953-1978
- Shigeyoshi Kittaka, 1978-1997
- Sanjiro Sakabe, 1997-1999
- Nobuyuki Koura, 1999-2002
- Takeyo Tsukamoto, 2002-2012
- Shigeru Nakane, 2012-2015
- Kazuo Motoyama, 2015-

== Notable faculty ==
- Makoto Asashima, Vice President, discoverer of activin
- Michael A. Cusumano, business administration, vice president, Massachusetts Institute of Technology professor
- Chiaki Mukai, JAXA astronaut, Vice President
- Teruaki Mukaiyama, chemist, former professor, discoverer of Mukaiyama aldol addition
- Kensō Soai, 2026 Nobel Prize laureate in Chemistry, professor, discoverer of Soai reaction
- Jaw-Shen Tsai, physicist, professor
- Noriaki Kano, professor emeritus
- Kazunori Kataoka, former professor, Humboldt Prize winner
- Norio Taniguchi, former professor, Proponent of Nanotechnology

== Notable alumni ==
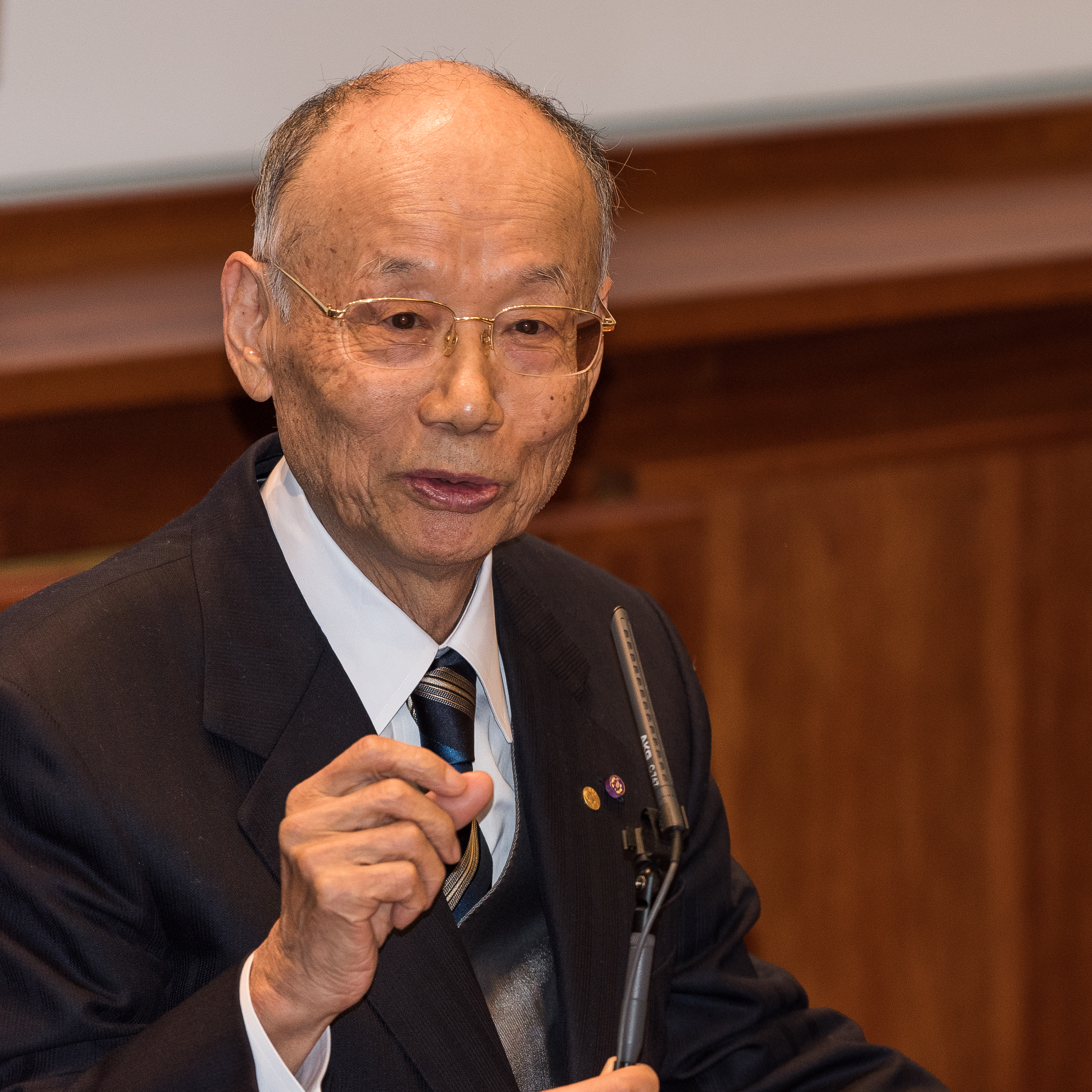
Satoshi Ōmura, Nobel Laureate in medicine in Stockholm in December 2015

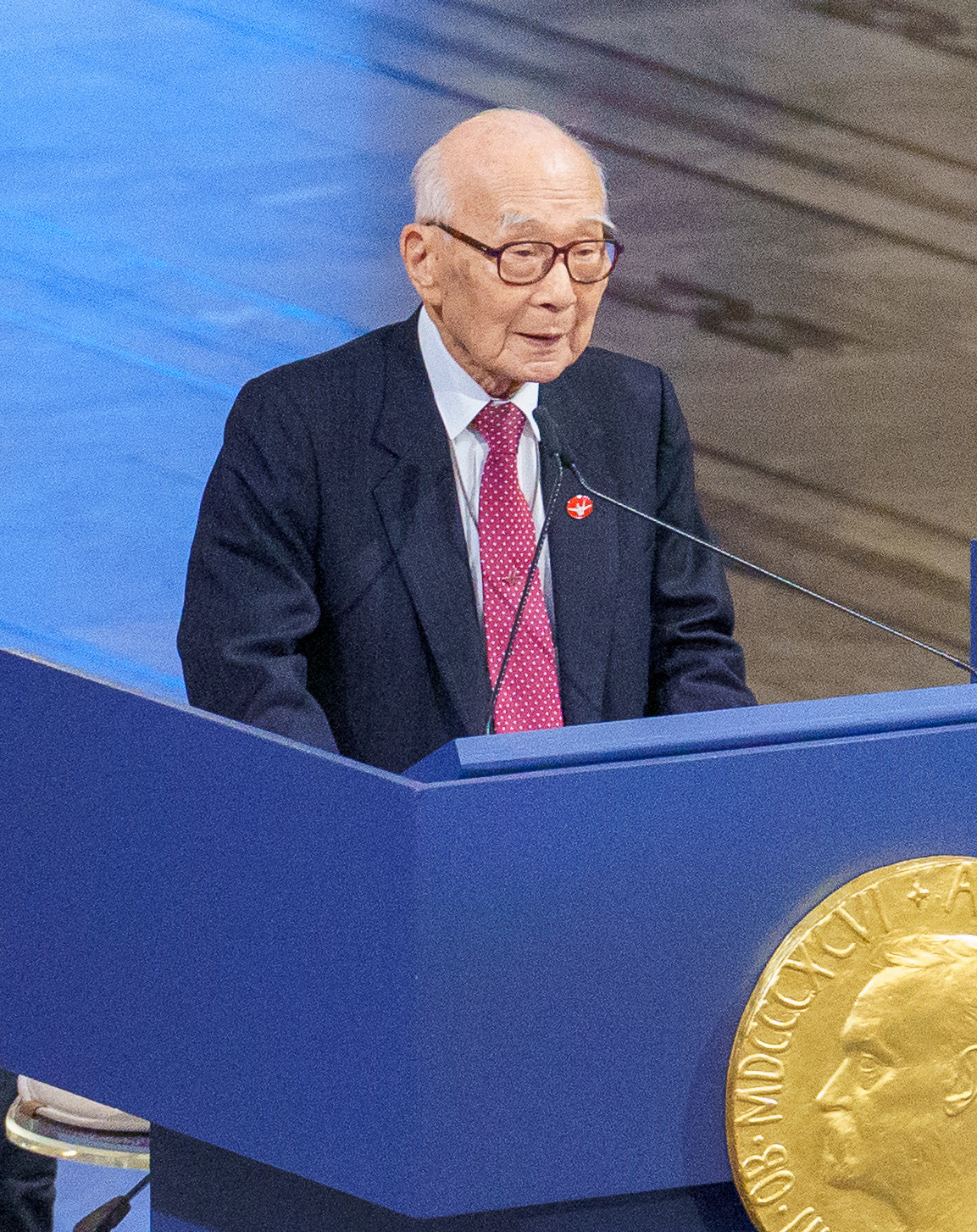
Terumi Tanaka, Representative of Nihon Hidankyo, 2024 Nobel Peace Prize Ceremony in Oslo, Norway

=== Nobel prize laureates ===
- Satoshi Ōmura, biochemist, 2015 Nobel Prize in Physiology or Medicine winner

=== Government ===
- Shigeru Yoshida, Prime Minister, (Attended University 1896 but dropped out)

=== Business ===
- Kazuo Motoyama, President of Asahi Soft Drinks, 2013-2015, Chairman of TUS 2015-
- Philip M. Condit, CEO of Boeing, 1996-2003
- Toshihiro Suzuki, CEO of Suzuki, 2016-
- Seiichi Sudo, Vice President of Toyota, 2013-2016
- Tatsuya Tanaka, President of Fujitsu, 2015-
- Shigeki Tanaka, President of Clariant Japan, 2016-
- Masahiro Inoue, CEO of Yahoo! Japan, 1996-2012
- Shigeru Nakane, CEO of SAP Japan, 1993-1999
- Shiinoki Shigeru, Vice President of Oracle Japan, 2013-2016
- Zenji Miura, CEO of Ricoh, 2013-
- Fumikathu Tokiwa, Kao Corporation Chairman. 1997-2000
- Shuhei Nakamoto, Honda Racing Corporation Vice President, Repsol Honda representative
- Takanobu Satō, President of Shinchosha. 1996-

=== Academia ===
- Jin Akiyama, mathematician, professor
- Isamu Shiina, professor, discoverer of 2-Methyl-6-nitrobenzoic anhydride, Shiina macrolactonization and Shiina esterification
- Yasuhiko Kojima, virologist, discoverer of Interferon
- Tetsuo Asakura, professor, developer of artificial blood vessels using silk
- Tashpolat Tiyip, president of Xinjiang University

=== Architecture ===
- Kazuo Shinohara, architect, Venice Biennale awarded a special commemorative Golden Lion
- Hideto Horiike, architect, Visiting Professor of the University of California, Los Angeles, Visiting Professor of the Massachusetts Institute of Technology

=== Media ===
- Tsuyoshi Muro, actor, (attended university but dropped out)

=== Others ===
- Masayoshi Soken, sound editor
- Hirokazu Yasuhara, video game designer
- Shigeru Nakanishi, artist
- Ryu Ota (1930–2009), politician
- Fushigi Yamada (born 1959), voice actress
- Hiroshi Sakurazaka, author
- Akihiro Murayama, mixed martial artist

== See also ==
- TSUBAME (satellite)
