= Shigeru Nakanishi =

Japanese artist

- Born: August 1946 (age 79); Tokyo, Japan
- Known for: Painting
- Website: www7b.biglobe.ne.jp/~nakanishi-art/index.html

Shigeru Nakanishi (中西 繁, Nakanishi Shigeru; born August 1946) is a Japanese artist from Tokyo, Japan.

== Life and work ==
Nakanishi graduated from the Tokyo University of Science Engineering Division, Architecture Section in 1969. He then became an architectural designer, painting as a hobby. After winning the leading prize in the Selection of Contemporary Western Painting in 1990, he made his debut with the first solo exhibition Melancholic Paris at the Ichimai-no-e Gallery in Ginza, Tokyo. He has held a solo exhibition every year since.

In 1995, he began his series of paintings titled Ruins after the Great Hanshin earthquake in Kobe.

In 2000, he retired from architecture and began painting exclusively. In 2001, he received the Special Commendation Citation at the 33rd NITTEN (Japan Fine Arts Exhibition) for painting Deserted Island 2001, depicting Hashima Island (Warship Island), Nagasaki. In 2002, he held an exhibition of his Deserted City series in Ginza, Tokyo. This series of paintings covered war-torn and deserted cities such as Sarajevo, Belgrade, Chernobyl, and Auschwitz.

In 2004, Nakanishi held the exhibition titled Landscape at Yokohama Red Brick Warehouse. Following the exhibition, he lived in Paris Montmartre for two years. He studied in the École des Beaux-Arts and travelled across Europe and the United States. He returned to Japan in 2006, touring with an exhibition termed Melancholic Paris II in 12 locations throughout the country.

In 2013 he painted a mural Stockholm Twilight at the Tokyo University of Science.

In 2014, he bought an inn abandoned in Nagoya Onsen, in the city Izunokuni, Shizuoka Prefecture, Japan. Having refurbished the inn, he founded what is called "Izunokuni Art Village". "Izunokuni Art Village" is a place dedicated to creation where everyone freely expresses his creativity.

== Exhibitions and awards ==
- 1990: Gold Prize at exhibition Selection of Contemporary Western Painting
- 2001: 33rd Nitten (Japan Fine Arts Exhibition) Special Commendation Citation for painting Deserted Island 2001 depicting Hashima Island, Nagasaki
- 2002: Exhibition of Deserted City in Ginza, Tokyo, first in series of paintings of Sarajevo, Belgrade, Chernobyl and Auschwitz. Rotating exhibition in July at Yokohama Red Brick Warehouse Building No.1 in Yokohama.
- 2003: Exhibition of Deserted City in Nagoya at Nagoya Electric Power Company's Culture Hall. Series of 376 illustrations for 1 year. Bonfire of the Bay series in Akahata Newspaper HQ at Yokohama Red Brick Warehouse, Building No. 2.
- 2004: Exhibition of Landscape at Yokohama Red Brick Warehouse
- 2005: 37th Nitten (Japan Fine Arts Exhibition) Special Commendation Citation for painting Dock.
- 2006: Touring exhibition of series Melancholic Paris II in 12 locations throughout Japan
- 2008: Exhibition of series Deserted City in Yamagata
- 2009: Exhibition of series Melancholic Paris III. Exhibition of series Deserted City in Osaka.
- 2010: Exhibition of Deserted City in Okinawa series
- 2011: Exhibition of Corridor of Light/Travel of Europe II series in Tokyo. Exhibition of series Ruins and Reproduction in Kochi.
- 2012: Exhibition of series Ruins and Reproduction in Yokohama
- 2013: Exhibition of series Ruins and Reproduction in Hiroshima
- 2015: Exhibition of series Ruins and Reproduction in New York
- 2016: Exhibition of series Ruins and Reproduction in Izunokuni

== Publications ==
- Oil painting tips from a professional artist (2006, Kodansha) ISBN 978-4062683999
- Initiation to oil painting (2008, Kodansha) ISBN 978-4062692700
