= Norio Taniguchi =

Japanese scientist (1912–1999)

- Born: May 27, 1912
- Died: November 15, 1999 (aged 87)
- Known for: Coined the term "nano-technology"
- Awards: European Society for Precision Engineering and Nanotechnology Lifetime Achievement Award
- Scientific career
- Workplaces: Tokyo University of Science

Norio Taniguchi (谷口 紀男, Taniguchi Norio; May 27, 1912 – November 15, 1999) was a professor of Tokyo University of Science. He coined the term nano-technology in 1974 to describe semiconductor processes such as thin film deposition and ion beam milling exhibiting characteristic control on the order of a nanometer: nano-technology "mainly consists of the processing of separation, consolidation, and deformation of materials by one atom or one molecule."

Taniguchi started his research on abrasive mechanisms of high precision machining of hard and brittle materials. At Tokyo University of Science, he went on to pioneer the application of energy beam techniques to ultra precision materials processing; these included electro discharge, microwave, electron beam, photon (laser) and ion beams.

He studied the developments in machining techniques from 1940 until the early 1970s and predicted correctly that by the late 1980s, techniques would have evolved to a degree that dimensional accuracies of better than 100 nm would be achievable.

== Recognition ==
The European Society for Precision Engineering and Nanotechnology presented Professor Taniguchi with its 1st Lifetime Achievement Award in Bremen, May 1999.

The citation on Professor Taniguchi's award read:

In recognition of his unique and outstanding contributions to research and development in the ultra precision materials processing technologies and in 1974, being the first to formulate and use the term Nanotechnology. Through his vision, writings and example of total dedication to his field of endeavour he has stimulated the development of what will be one of the dominant technologies of the 21st Century.
