= Isamu Shiina =

Japanese chemist

Isamu Shiina (椎名 勇, Shiina Isamu) is professor of chemistry at Tokyo University of Science (TUS), Japan. He completed his BSc and MSc at TUS, and he joined the group of Prof. Teruaki Mukaiyama at TUS as an assistant professor in 1992. After receiving his PhD from the University of Tokyo (UT) in 1997, he was promoted to lecturer at the TUS, and then appointed to an associate professor (2003) and a full professor (2008). He has received the Chemical Society of Japan (CSJ) Award for Young Chemists (1997), the CSJ Award for Creative Work (2013), and the Commendation for Science and Technology Prizes by the Ministries of Japan (2015). His research interests include the development of useful synthetic methods and the total synthesis of natural products. In particular, the dehydration condensation reaction using MNBA (Shiina esterification and Shiina macrolactonization) is suitable for synthesis of unstable molecules and is now being widely used around the world in fields such as pharmaceutical production.

== Major awards ==
- 1997: The Chemical Society of Japan Award for Young Chemists (Chemical Society of Japan)
- 2013: The Chemical Society of Japan Award for Creative Work (Chemical Society of Japan)
- 2014: The Inoue Prize for Science (Inoue Foundation for Science)
- 2014: The Ichimura Prize for Science (The New Technology Development Foundation)
- 2015: The Prize for Science and Technology [Development Category] (The Commendation for Science and Technology by the Ministry of Education, Culture, Sports, Science and Technology, Japan)
- 2024: The Synthetic Organic Chemistry Award, Japan (The Society of Synthetic Organic Chemistry, Japan)

== See also ==
- 2-Methyl-6-nitrobenzoic anhydride
- Shiina macrolactonization
- Shiina esterification
