= Eiichi Nakamura (chemist) =

Japanese chemist (born 1951)

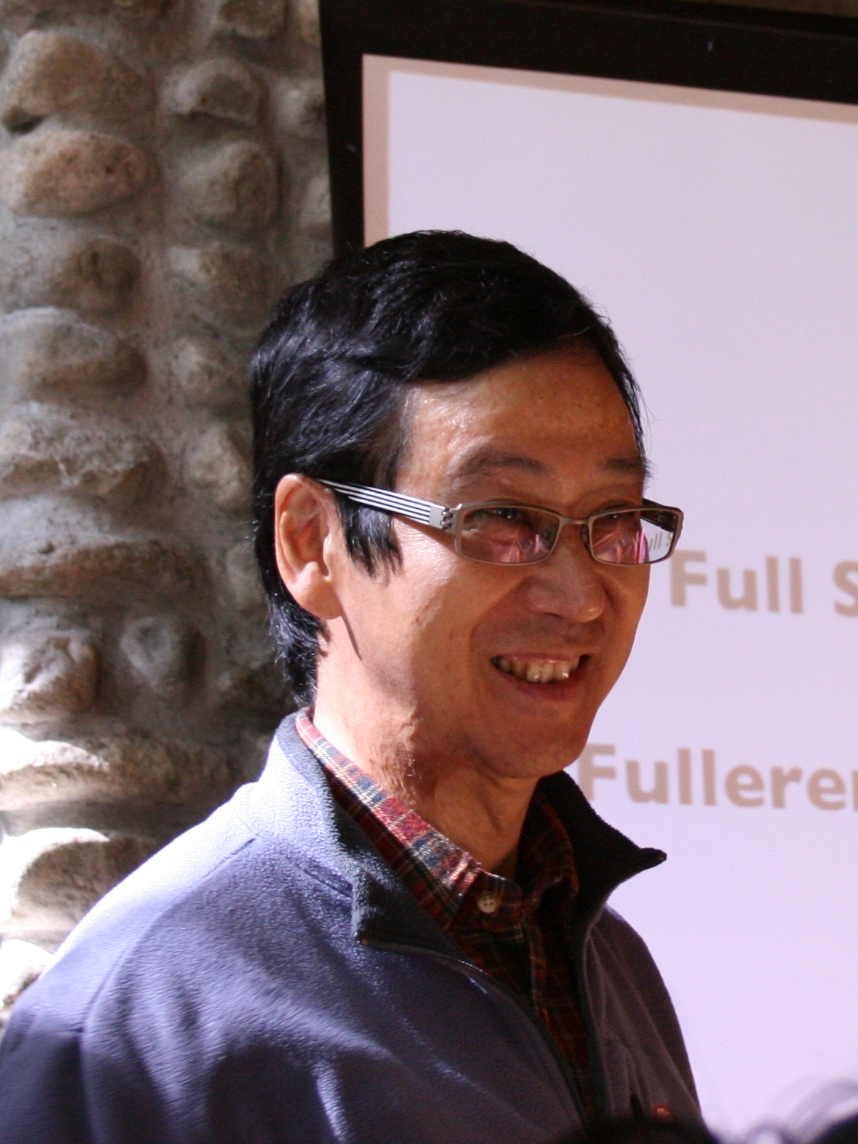
- Eiichi in 2014
- Born: 1951 (age 74–75); Tokyo, Japan
- Education: Tokyo Institute of Technology
- Known for: Iron catalyst and fullerene chemistry
- Awards: Medal with Purple Ribbon
- Scientific career
- Workplaces: University of Tokyo,Nankai University
- Doctoral advisor: Isao Kuwajima

Eiichi Nakamura (中村 栄一, Nakamura Eiichi; born 24 February 1951) is a Japanese chemist and professor of chemistry at University of Tokyo in Japan, also appointed as lecture profession in Nankai University in Tianjin, China from Sep 2025.

== Education ==
- 1973 BS Faculty of Science, Tokyo Institute of Technology (Professor Teruaki Mukaiyama)
- 1978 PhD in chemistry, Department of Chemistry, Tokyo Institute of Technology (Professor Isao Kuwajima)
- 1978-1980 Postdoctoral Research Associate, Department of Chemistry, Columbia University, New York (Professor Gilbert Stork)

== Major research interests ==
- catalyst chemistry, fullerene chemistry, supramolecular chemistry, organic solar cells, Transmission electron microscopy.

== Academic experience ==
- 1980-1984 Assistant Professor, Department of Chemistry, Tokyo Institute of Technology
- 1984-1993 Associate Professor, Department of Chemistry, Tokyo Institute of Technology
- 1989-1991 Adjunct Associate Professor, Department of Applied Molecular Science, Institute for Molecular Science
- 1993-1995 Professor, Department of Chemistry, Tokyo Institute of Technology
- 1995–2016 Professor, Department of Chemistry, The University of Tokyo
- 2004-2010 ERATO Nakamura Functional Carbon Cluster program research director, Japan Science and Technology Agency (JST)
- 2007-2016 The University of Tokyo, Chemistry Innovation Global COE Program Leader
- 2016.04-2019.03, Molecular Technology Innovation Chair Professor, The University of Tokyo
- 2019.04-present, University Professor, The University of Tokyo, Department of Chemistry
- 2024.12-present, Lecture Professor, Nankai University

== Professional functions ==
- 2003-2006 Senior Program Officer in Chemistry, Japan Society for the Promotion of Science (JSPS), Research Center for Science Systems
- 2006-2008 Corresponding Member of the Science Council of Japan
- 2006-2007 Senior Program Officer (on funding scheme study), The Japan Society for the Promotion of Science (JSPS)
- 2011- Program Director and Chair, Japan Agency for Science and Technology (JST)
- 2009-2011 Kaiteki Institute Co. Advisory board member
- 2012 Visiting Professorship for Senior International Scientists, ICCAS, Beijing, China
- May 21, 2015 Visiting Professorship for Nanjing University, Nanjing, China
- May 23, 2015 Visiting Professorship for Nanjing University of Technology, Nanjing, China

== Awards and honors ==
- Young Chemists Award (Chemical Society of Japan, 1984)
- Yamanouchi Award in Synthetic Organic Chemistry (1991)
- Tejima Memorial Award (Tokyo Institute of Technology, 1992)
- The Japan IBM Science Prize (1993)
- Nagoya Silver Medal for Organic Chemistry (2001)
- The Chemical Society of Japan Award (2003)
- Humboldt Research Award (2006)
- The Medal with Purple Ribbon (Shiju Hosho) (His Majesty of Japan, 2009)
- the Arthur C. Cope Scholar Award of ACS (2010)
- Elected Fellow of the American Association for the Advancement of Science (1998)
- Elected Foreign Fellow of the Royal Society of Chemistry (U. K., 2005)
- Honorary Foreign Member of the American Academy of Arts and Sciences (2008)
- Honorary Member of the Israel Chemical Society (2009)
- The Arthur C. Cope Scholar Award of ACS（2010）
- Centenary Prize 2014, Royal Society of Chemistry（2014）
- Foreign Member of the Royal Society (2025)
- The Order of the Sacred Treasure, Gold Rays with Neck Ribbon ( 2024)

== Special lectureships ==
- R. C. Fuson Visiting Professor, University of Illinois (1990)
- Syntex Distinguished Lectureship. Colorado State University (1996)
- Parke Davis-Warner Lambert Distinguished Lectureship, Ohio State University (1997)
- Troisieme Cycle Lectureship, Switzerland (2000)
- Van der Kerk Lectureship, University of Utrecht (2001)
- Lady Davis Fellowship, Technion, Israel (2002-3)
- Alfred Blomquist Lectureship, Cornell (2003)
- Rhodia Lecturer, French Chemical Society (2004)
- Chinese Academy of Science Lectureship, (Beijing, 2004)
- Gilbert Stork Lecture, Columbia University (2006)
- William Dauben Memorial Lectureship, University of California, Berkeley (2006)
- Novartis Chemistry Lectureship (2006-7)
- Wyeth Lectureship, University of Pennsylvania (2007)
- Campus Lecturer, Institut Catala d’Investigacle Quimica (Tarragona, 2007)
- H. C. Brown Lecture, Purdue University (2008)
- W. S. Johnson Lecture, Stanford University (2008)

== Editorial service ==
=== Associate editor ===
- Journal of Synthetic Organic Chemistry Japan (1986–88 and 1998-2000)
- Chemistry Letters (1992–98)
- Organic Letters (2000-2005)
- Journal of the American Chemical Society (2009-)

=== Editorial board ===
- Journal of Molecular Catalysis (1994-2003)
- Ultrasonics Sonochemistry (1994-2003)
- Topics in Stereochemistry (1996-2006)
- Journal of Organometallic Chemistry (2002-2005)
- Organic and Biomolecular Chemistry (2003-2012)
- Organic Letters (2006-2008)
- Accounts of Chemical Research (2006-2008)
- Chemistry-An Asian Journal (2006-2009)
- Angewandte Chemie (International Advisory Board: 2006-2009)
- Chemistry-An Asian Journal (International Advisory Board: 2009-)

== Other ==
- Chairman/Founder, Tateshina Conference on Organic Chemistry (2000-2010)
- Advisory Committee, Institute of Chemistry, Academia Sinica, Taiwan (2001-2007)
- International Advisory Board, The Sixteenth International Conference on Physical Organic Chemistry (2002)
