= Mukaiyama aldol addition =

Organic reaction between a silyl enol ether and an aldehyde or formate

educts
aldehyde (R^{1} = Alkyl, Aryl)
or formate (R^{1} = OR)
silyl enol ether (R^{1} = Alkyl, Aryl, H;
R^{2} = Alkyl, Aryl, H, OR, SR)

In organic chemistry, the Mukaiyama aldol addition is an organic reaction and a type of aldol reaction between a silyl enol ether (R_{2}C=CR−O−Si(CH_{3})_{3}) and an aldehyde (R−CH=O) or formate (R−O−CH=O). The reaction was reported in 1973 by Teruaki Mukaiyama, Koichi Narasaka and Kazuo Banno from the Laboratory of Organic Chemistry, Tokyo Institute of Technology. His choice of reactants allows for a crossed aldol reaction between an aldehyde and a ketone (>C=O), or a different aldehyde without self-condensation of the aldehyde. For this reason the reaction is used extensively in organic synthesis.

== General reaction scheme ==
The Mukaiyama aldol addition is a Lewis acid-mediated addition of enol silanes to carbonyl (C=O) compounds. In this reaction, compounds with various organic groups can be used (see educts). A basic version (R^{2} = H) without the presence of chiral catalysts is shown below.

Simplified overview with a stereocenter

A racemic mix of enantiomers is built. If Z- or E-enol silanes are used in this reaction a mixture of four products occurs, yielding two racemates.

Overview of reaction with consideration of stereochemistry

Whether the anti-diastereomer or the syn-diastereomer is built depends largely on reaction conditions, substrates and Lewis acids.

The archetypical reaction is that of the silyl enol ether of cyclohexanone, (CH_{2})_{5}CO, with benzaldehyde, C_{6}H_{5}CHO. At room temperature it produces a diastereomeric mixture of threo (63%) and erythro (19%) β-hydroxyketone as well as 6% of the exocyclic, enone condensation product. In its original scope the Lewis acid (titanium tetrachloride, TiCl_{4}) was used in stoichiometric amounts but truly catalytic systems exist as well. The reaction is also optimized for asymmetric synthesis.

== Mechanism ==
Below, the reaction mechanism is shown with R^{2} = H:

Mukaiyama Aldol-MechanismusV7 en

In the cited example the Lewis acid TiCl_{4} is used. First, the Lewis acid activates the aldehyde component followed by carbon-carbon bond formation between the enol silane and the activated aldehyde. With the loss of a chlorosilane the compound 1 is built. The desired product, a racemate of 2 and 3, is obtained by aqueous work-up.

== Stereoselection ==
The Mukaiyama aldol reaction does not follow the Zimmerman-Traxler model. Carreira has described particularly useful asymmetric methodology with silyl ketene acetals, noteworthy for its high levels of enantioselectivity and wide substrate scope. The method works on unbranched aliphatic aldehydes, which are often poor electrophiles for catalytic, asymmetric processes. This may be due to poor electronic and steric differentiation between their enantiofaces.

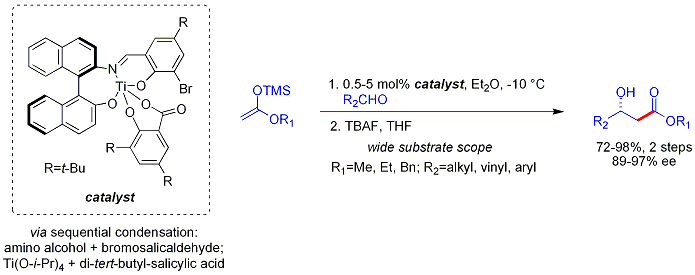

The analogous vinylogous Mukaiyama aldol process can also be rendered catalytic and asymmetric. The example shown below works efficiently for aromatic (but not aliphatic) aldehydes and the mechanism is believed to involve a chiral, metal-bound dienolate.

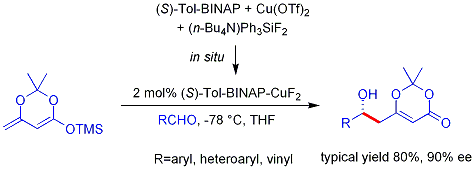

== Scope ==
A typical reaction involving two ketones is that between acetophenone as the enol and acetone:

Mukaiyama aldol between two ketones

Ketone reactions of this type require higher reaction temperatures. For this work Mukaiyama was inspired by earlier work done by Georg Wittig in 1966 on crossed aldol reactions with lithiated imines. Competing work with lithium enolate aldol reactions was published also in 1973 by Herbert O. House.

Mukaiyama employed in his rendition of taxol total synthesis (1999) two aldol additions, one with a ketene silyl acetal and excess magnesium bromide:

Mukaiyama aldol in taxol synthesis

and a second one with an amine chiral ligand and a triflate salt catalyst:

Mukaiyama asymmetric aldol taxol

Utilization of chiral Lewis acid complexes and Lewis bases in asymmetric catalytic processes is the fastest-growing area in the usage of the Mukaiyama aldol reaction.
