= 4-Pyrrolidinylpyridine =

Names
- Preferred IUPAC name 4-(Pyrrolidin-1-yl)pyridine
- Other names 4-(1-pyrrolidinyl)pyridine

Identifiers
CAS Number	2456-81-7
3D model (JSmol)	Interactive image
ChemSpider	68092
ECHA InfoCard	100.017.759
EC Number	219-534-2
PubChem CID	75567
UNII	DH59VKG9S4
CompTox Dashboard (EPA)	DTXSID90179299
- InChI: InChI=1S/C9H12N2/c1-2-8-11(7-1)9-3-5-10-6-4-9/h3-6H,1-2,7-8H2 Key: RGUKYNXWOWSRET-UHFFFAOYSA-N
- SMILES: C1CCN(C1)C2=CC=NC=C2

Properties
Chemical formula	C_{9}H_{12}N_{2}
Molar mass	148.209 g·mol^{−1}
Appearance	white solid
Melting point	55–56 °C (131–133 °F; 328–329 K)
Boiling point	170–171 °C (338–340 °F; 443–444 K) 12 TTor

Hazards
- GHS labelling
Pictograms	(GHS05: Corrosive) (GHS06: Toxic)
Signal word	Danger
Hazard statements	H301, H314
Precautionary statements	P260, P264, P270, P280, P301+P310, P301+P330+P331, P303+P361+P353, P304+P340, P305+P351+P338, P310, P321, P330, P363, P405, P501
- Except where otherwise noted, data are given for materials in their standard state (at 25 °C [77 °F], 100 kPa). Infobox references

4-Pyrrolidinylpyridine or 4-pyrrolidinopyridine (PPY) is an organic compound with the formula (CH_{2})_{4}NC_{5}H_{4}N. The molecule consists of a pyrrodinyl group ((CH_{2})_{4}N-) attached via N to the 4-position of pyridine. It is a white solid. The compound has attracted interest because it (pK_{a} = 9.58) is more basic than 4-dimethylaminopyridine (pK_{a} = 9.41). It is a popular base catalyst.
