= Organic Letters =

- Discipline: Organic chemistry
- Language: English
- Edited by: Marisa C. Kozlowski

Publication details
- History: 1999-present
- Publisher: American Chemical Society (United States)
- Frequency: Biweekly
- Impact factor: 4.9 (2023)

Standard abbreviations
- ISO 4: Org. Lett.

Indexing
- CODEN: ORLEF7
- ISSN: 1523-7060 (print); 1523-7052 (web)

Links
- Journal homepage

Organic Letters is a biweekly peer-reviewed scientific journal covering research in organic chemistry. It was established in 1999 and is published by the American Chemical Society. In 2014, the journal moved to a hybrid open access publishing model. The founding editor-in-chief was Amos Smith. The current editor-in-chief is Marisa C. Kozlowski. The journal is abstracted and indexed in: the Science Citation Index Expanded, Scopus, Academic Search Premier, BIOSIS Previews, Chemical Abstracts Service, EMBASE, and MEDLINE.
