= Yamaguchi esterification =

Chemical reaction

Named after	Masaru Yamaguchi
Reaction type	Coupling reaction

Identifiers
Organic Chemistry Portal	yamaguchi-esterification
RSC ontology ID	RXNO:0000309

The Yamaguchi esterification is the chemical reaction of an aliphatic carboxylic acid and 2,4,6-trichlorobenzoyl chloride (TCBC, Yamaguchi reagent) to form a mixed anhydride which, upon reaction with an alcohol in the presence of stoichiometric amount of DMAP, produces the desired ester. It was first reported by Masaru Yamaguchi et al. in 1979.

Yamaguchi esterification

It is especially useful in the synthesis of macro-lactones and highly functionalised esters.

== Reaction mechanism ==
The aliphatic carboxylate adds to the carbonyl carbon of Yamaguchi reagent, forming a mixed anhydride, which is then attacked by DMAP regioselectively at the less hindered carbon, producing acyl-substituted DMAP. This highly electrophilic agent is then attacked by the alcohol to form the product ester.

The in situ formation of the symmetric aliphatic anhydride is proposed to explain the regioselectivity observed in the reactions of aliphatic acids, based on the fact that aliphatic carboxylates are more nucleophilic, and aliphatic anhydrides are more electrophilic towards DMAP and alcohol than their counterparts.

== See also ==
- Mitsunobu reaction
- Macrolide
