= Fischer–Speier esterification =

Type of chemical reaction

Esterification
Named after	Emil Fischer; Arthur Speier
Reaction type	Coupling reaction

Identifiers
Organic Chemistry Portal	fischer-esterification
RSC ontology ID	RXNO:0000167

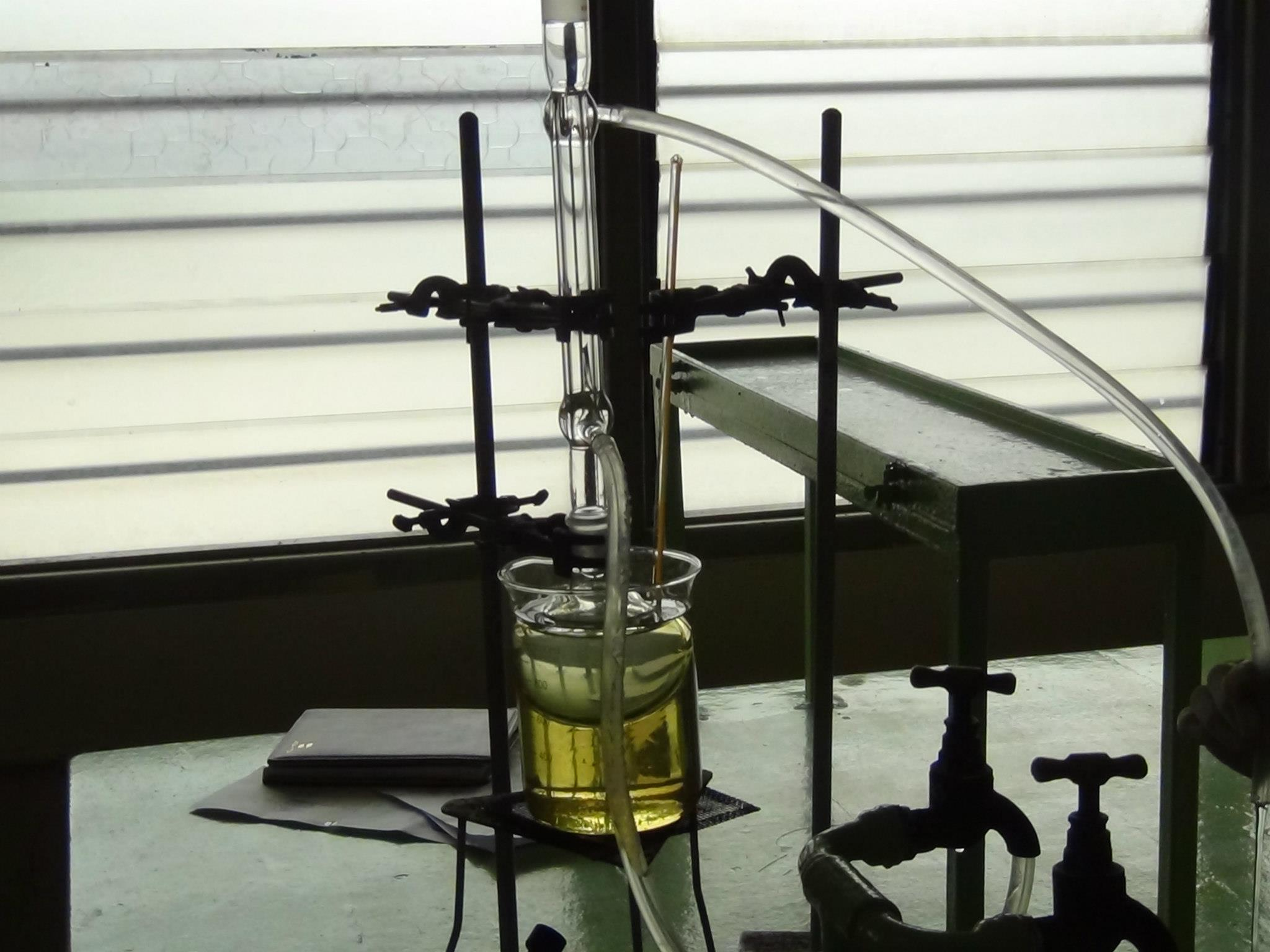
The synthesis of methyl benzoate by Fischer–Speier esterification

Fischer esterification or Fischer–Speier esterification is a special type of esterification by refluxing a carboxylic acid and an alcohol in the presence of an acid catalyst. The reaction was first described by Emil Fischer and Arthur Speier in 1895. Most carboxylic acids are suitable for the reaction, but the alcohol should generally be primary or secondary. Tertiary alcohols are prone to elimination. Contrary to common misconception found in organic chemistry textbooks, phenols can also be esterified to give good to near quantitative yield of products. Commonly used catalysts for a Fischer esterification include sulfuric acid, p-toluenesulfonic acid, and Lewis acids such as scandium(III) triflate. For more valuable or sensitive substrates (for example, biomaterials) other, milder procedures such as Steglich esterification are used. The reaction is often carried out without a solvent (particularly when a large reagent excess of the alcohol reagent is used) or in a non-polar solvent (e.g. toluene, hexane) that can facilitate Dean–Stark distillation to remove the water byproduct. Typical reaction times vary from 1–10 hours at temperatures of 60–110 °C.

Direct acylations of alcohols with carboxylic acids is preferred over acylations with anhydrides (poor atom economy of the reaction) or acid chlorides (moisture sensitive reagents). The main disadvantage of direct acylation is the unfavorable chemical equilibrium that must be remedied (e.g. by a large excess of one of the reagents), or by the removal of water (e.g. by using Dean–Stark distillation or including a drying agent such as anhydrous salts, molecular sieves, or a large amount of certain acids as catalyst in the reaction mixture).

== Overview ==
Fischer esterification is an acyl substitution reaction based on the electrophilicity of the carbonyl carbon and the nucleophilicity of an alcohol. Carboxylic acids tend to be deprotonated by nucleophiles, which gives an unreactive carboxylate. Although kinetically very stable in the absence of catalysts, esters tend to eventually hydrolyse in the presence of water.

Several steps can be taken to turn this unfavourable reaction into a favourable one.

The reaction mechanism for this reaction has several steps:

1. Proton transfer from acid catalyst to carbonyl oxygen increases electrophilicity of carbonyl carbon.
2. The carbonyl carbon is then attacked by the nucleophilic oxygen atom of the alcohol
3. Proton transfer from the oxonium ion to a second molecule of the alcohol gives an activated complex
4. Protonation of one of the hydroxy groups of the activated complex gives a new oxonium ion.
5. Loss of water from this oxonium ion and subsequent deprotonation gives the ester.

A generic mechanism for an acid Fischer esterification is shown below.

Fischer esterification mechanism

== Advantages and disadvantages ==
=== Advantages ===
The primary advantages of Fischer esterification compared to other esterification processes are based on its relative simplicity. Straightforward acidic conditions can be used if acid-sensitive functional groups are not an issue; sulfuric acid can be used; weaker acids can be used with a tradeoff of longer reaction times. Because the reagents used are "direct," there is less environmental impact in terms of waste products and harmfulness of the reagents. Alkyl halides are potential greenhouse gases or ozone depletors, carcinogens, and possible ecological poisons. Acid chlorides evolve hydrogen chloride gas upon contact with atmospheric moisture, are corrosive, react vigorously with water and other nucleophiles (sometimes dangerously); they are easily quenched by other nucleophiles besides the desired alcohol; their most common synthesis routes involve the evolution of toxic carbon monoxide or sulfur dioxide gases (depending on the synthesis process used).

Acid anhydrides are more reactive than esters because the leaving group is a carboxylate anion—a better leaving group than an alkoxide anion because their negative charge is more delocalised. However, such routes generally result in poor atom economy. For example, in reacting ethanol with acetic anhydride, ethyl acetate forms and acetic acid is eliminated as a leaving group, which is considerably less reactive than an acid anhydride and will be left as a byproduct (in a wasteful 1:1 ratio with the ester product) if product is collected immediately. If conditions are acidic enough, the acetic acid can be further reacted via the Fischer esterification pathway, but at a much slower pace. However, in many carefully designed syntheses, reagents can be designed such that acid anhydrides are generated in situ and carboxylic acid byproducts are reactivated, and Fischer esterification routes are not necessarily mutually exclusive with acetic anhydride routes. Examples of this include the common undergraduate organic lab experiment involving the acetylation of salicylic acid to yield aspirin.

Fischer esterification is primarily a thermodynamically-controlled process: because of its slowness, the most stable ester tends to be the major product. This can be a desirable trait if there are multiple reaction sites and side product esters to be avoided. In contrast, rapid reactions involving acid anhydrides or acid chlorides are often kinetically-controlled.

=== Disadvantages ===
The primary disadvantages of Fischer esterification routes are its thermodynamic reversibility and relatively slow reaction rates—often on the scale of several hours to years, depending on the reaction conditions. Workarounds to this can be inconvenient if there are other functional groups sensitive to strong acid, in which case other catalytic acids may be chosen. If the product ester has a lower boiling point than either water or the reagents, the product may be distilled rather than water; this is common as esters with no protic functional groups tend to have lower boiling points than their protic parent reagents. Purification and extraction are easier if the ester product can be distilled away from the reagents and byproducts, but reaction rate can be slowed because overall reaction temperature can be limited in this scenario. A more inconvenient scenario is if the reagents have a lower boiling point than either the ester product or water, in which case the reaction mixture must be capped and refluxed and a large excess of starting material added. In this case anhydrous salts, such as copper(II) sulfate or potassium pyrosulfate, can also be added to sequester the water by forming hydrates, shifting the equilibrium towards ester products. The reaction mixture containing the product can then be decanted or filtered to remove the drying agent prior to the final workup.

== In wine aging ==
The natural esterification that takes place in wines and other alcoholic beverages during the aging process is an example of acid-catalysed esterification. Over time, the acidity of the acetic acid and tannins in an aging wine will catalytically protonate other organic acids (including acetic acid itself), encouraging ethanol to react as a nucleophile. As a result, ethyl acetate—the ester of ethanol and acetic acid—is the most abundant ester in wines. Other combinations of organic alcohols (or phenol-containing compounds) and organic acids lead to a variety of different esters in wines, contributing to their different flavours, smells and tastes. Of course, when compared to sulfuric acid conditions, the acid conditions in a wine are mild, so yield is low (often in tenths or hundredths of a percentage point by volume) and take years for ester to accumulate.

== Variations ==
Tetrabutylammonium tribromide (TBATB) can serve as an effective but unconventional catalyst for this reaction. It is believed that hydrobromic acid released by TBATB protonates the alcohol rather than the carboxylic acid, making the carboxylate the actual nucleophile. This would be a reversal of the standard esterification mechanism. An example of this method is the acylation of 3-phenylpropanol using glacial acetic acid and TBATB. The reaction generates the ester in 15 minutes in a 95% yield without the need to remove water.

== Arthur Speier ==
Arthur Speier was a German chemist and pharmacist who, along with Emil Fischer, developed Fischer–Speier esterification.

== See also ==
- Fischer glycosidation - the coupling of an alcohol and a sugar
