= Steglich esterification =

Chemical reaction

Named after	Wolfgang Steglich
Reaction type	Coupling reaction

Identifiers
Organic Chemistry Portal	steglich-esterification

The Steglich esterification is a variation of an esterification with dicyclohexylcarbodiimide (DCC) as a coupling reagent and 4-dimethylaminopyridine (DMAP) as a catalyst. The reaction was first described by Wolfgang Steglich in 1978. It is an adaptation of an older method for the formation of amides by means of DCC (dicyclohexylcarbodiimide) and 1-hydroxybenzotriazole (HOBT).

Steglich overview

This reaction generally takes place at room temperature. A variety of polar aprotic solvents can be used. Because the reaction is mild, esters can be obtained that are inaccessible through other methods for instance esters of the sensitive 2,4-dihydroxybenzoic acid. A characteristic is the formal uptake of water generated in the reaction by DCC, forming the urea compound dicyclohexylurea (DCU).

== Reaction mechanism ==
The reaction mechanism is described as follows:

With amines, the reaction proceeds without problems to the corresponding amides because amines are more nucleophilic. If the esterification is slow, a side-reaction occurs, diminishing the final yield or complicating purification of the product. This side-reaction is a 1,3-rearrangement of the O-acyl intermediate to an N-acylurea which is unable to further react with the alcohol. DMAP suppresses this side reaction, acting as an acyl transfer-reagent in the following manner:
