= 4-Dimethylaminopyridine =

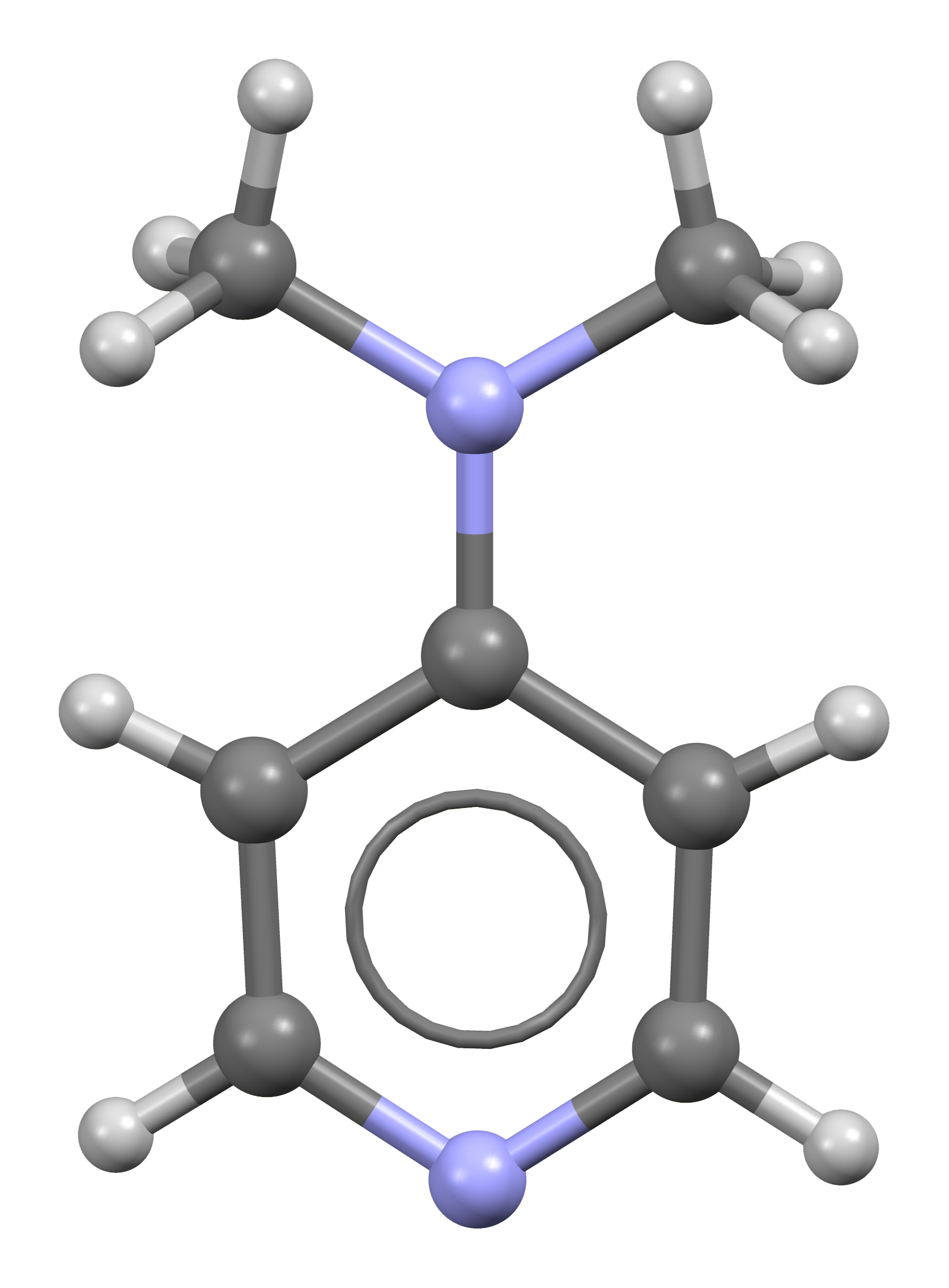

Names
- IUPAC names Dimethyl(pyridin-4-yl)azane; Dimethyl(pyridin-4-yl)amine
- Preferred IUPAC name N,N-Dimethylpyridin-4-amine
- Other names 4-(Dimethylamino)pyridine; N,N-Dimethyl-4-aminopyridine; DMAP; 4-Dimethylaminopyridine; 4-(Dimethylamino)azine; N,N-dimethyl-4-aminoazine; 4-(Dimethylamino)azabenzene; N,N-Dimethyl-4-aminoazabenzene

Identifiers
CAS Number	1122-58-3
3D model (JSmol)	Interactive image
ChemSpider	13646
ECHA InfoCard	100.013.049
PubChem CID	14284
UNII	PFP1R6P0S8
CompTox Dashboard (EPA)	DTXSID0044369
- InChI: InChI=1S/C7H10N2/c1-9(2)7-3-5-8-6-4-7/h3-6H,1-2H3 Key: VHYFNPMBLIVWCW-UHFFFAOYSA-N; InChI=1/C7H10N2/c1-9(2)7-3-5-8-6-4-7/h3-6H,1-2H3 Key: VHYFNPMBLIVWCW-UHFFFAOYAL
- SMILES: n1ccc(N(C)C)cc1

Properties
Chemical formula	C_{7}H_{10}N_{2}
Molar mass	122.17 g/mol
Appearance	white solid
Melting point	110 to 113 °C (230 to 235 °F; 383 to 386 K)
Boiling point	162 °C (324 °F; 435 K) at 50 mmHg
Acidity (pK_{a})	9.6 in water, 17.95 (pK_{a} of conjugate acid in acetonitrile)

Hazards
- GHS labelling
Pictograms	(GHS06: Toxic) (GHS05: Corrosive) (GHS08: Health hazard)
Signal word	Danger
Hazard statements	H301+H331, H310, H315, H319, H335
Precautionary statements	P280, P305+P351+P338, P337+P313
- Lethal dose or concentration (LD, LC)
LD_{50} (median dose)	deer mice: oral, 450 mg/kg mice: oral, 350 mg/kg/day rat: oral, 250 mg/mL fly: oral, 0.15 mg/mL
- Safety data sheet (SDS)
- Except where otherwise noted, data are given for materials in their standard state (at 25 °C [77 °F], 100 kPa). verify (what is ?) Infobox references

4-Dimethylaminopyridine (DMAP) is a derivative of pyridine with the chemical formula (CH_{3})_{2}NC_{5}H_{4}N. This white solid is of interest because it is more basic than pyridine, owing to the resonance stabilisation of the conjugate acid from the NMe_{2} substituent.

Because of its basicity, DMAP is a useful nucleophilic catalyst for a variety of reactions such as esterifications with anhydrides, the Baylis-Hillman reaction, hydrosilylations, tritylation, the Steglich rearrangement, Staudinger synthesis of β-lactams and many more. DMAP analogues are used in kinetic resolution experiments of mainly secondary alcohols and Evans auxiliary type amides.

== Preparation ==
DMAP can be prepared in a two-step procedure from pyridine, which is first oxidized to 4-pyridylpyridinium cation. This cation then reacts with dimethylamine:

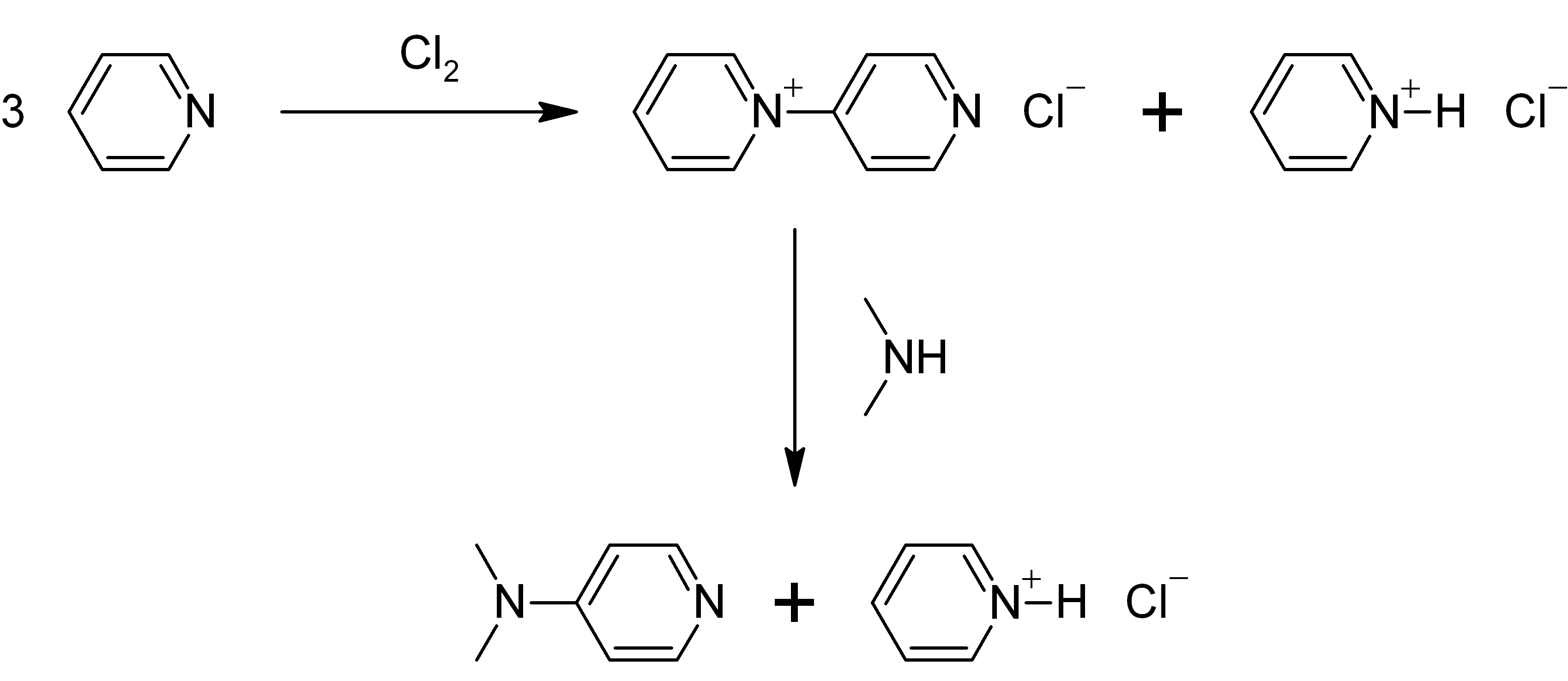

== Esterification catalyst ==
In the case of esterification with acetic anhydrides the currently accepted mechanism involves three steps. First, DMAP and acetic anhydride react in a pre-equilibrium reaction to form an ion pair of acetate and the acetylpyridinium ion. In the second step the alcohol adds to the acetylpyridinium, and elimination of pyridine forms an ester. Here the acetate acts as a base to remove the proton from the alcohol as it nucleophilically adds to the activated acylpyridinium. The bond from the acetyl group to the catalyst gets cleaved to generate the catalyst and the ester. The described bond formation and breaking process runs synchronous concerted without the appearance of a tetrahedral intermediate. The acetic acid formed will then protonate the DMAP. In the last step of the catalytic cycle the auxiliary base (usually triethylamine or pyridine) deprotonates the protonated DMAP, reforming the catalyst. The reaction runs through the described nucleophilic reaction pathway irrespective of the anhydride used, but the mechanism changes with the pKa value of the alcohol used. For example, the reaction runs through a base-catalyzed reaction pathway in the case of a phenol. In this case, DMAP acts as a base and deprotonates the phenol, and the resulting phenolate ion adds to the anhydride.

== Safety ==
DMAP has a relatively high toxicity and is particularly dangerous because of its ability to be absorbed through the skin. It is also corrosive.

== Related compound ==
- 4-Pyrrolidinylpyridine
