= Acid sulfate soil =

Soils formed under waterlogged conditions

Acid sulfate soils are naturally occurring soils, sediments or organic substrates (e.g. peat) that are formed under waterlogged conditions. These soils contain iron sulfide minerals (predominantly as the mineral pyrite) and/or their oxidation products. In an undisturbed state below the water table, acid sulfate soils are benign. However, if the soils are drained, excavated or otherwise exposed to air, the sulfides react with oxygen to form sulfuric acid.

Release of this sulfuric acid from the soil can in turn release iron, aluminium, and other heavy metals and metalloids (particularly arsenic) within the soil. Once mobilized in this way, the acid and metals can create a variety of adverse impacts: killing vegetation, seeping into and acidifying groundwater and surface water bodies, killing fish and other aquatic organisms, and degrading concrete and steel structures to the point of failure.

== Formation ==
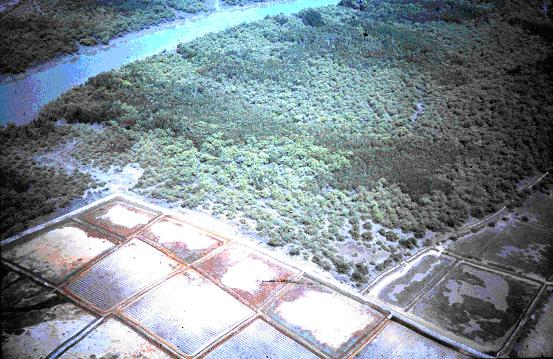
Polders with acid sulfate soils in Guinea-Bissau along a sea-arm amidst mangroves

The soils and sediments most prone to becoming acid sulfate soils formed within the last 10,000 years, after the last major sea level rise. When the sea level rose and inundated the land, sulfate in the seawater mixed with land sediments containing iron oxides and organic matter. Under these anaerobic conditions, lithotrophic bacteria such as Desulfovibrio desulfuricans obtain oxygen for respiration through the reduction of sulfate ions in sea or groundwater, producing hydrogen sulfide. This in turn reacts with dissolved ferrous iron, forming very fine grained and highly reactive framboid crystals of iron sulfides such as (pyrite). Up to a point, warmer temperatures are more favourable conditions for these bacteria, creating a greater potential for formation of iron sulfides. Tropical waterlogged environments, such as mangrove swamps or estuaries, may contain higher levels of pyrite than those formed in more temperate climates.

The pyrite is stable until exposed to air, at which point the pyrite rapidly oxidises and produces sulfuric acid. The impacts of acid sulfate soil leachate may persist over a long time, and/or peak seasonally (after dry periods with the first rains). In some areas of Australia, acid sulfate soils that drained 100 years ago are still releasing acid (e.g., Gillman wetlands, South Australia).

=== Generalised Pyrite Oxidation Reaction ===
When drained, soils containing reduced inorganic sulfides such as pyrite may become extremely acidic (pH < 4) due to the oxidation of sulfides into sulfuric acid (H_{2}SO_{4}):

$\ce{4 FeS2 + 15 O2 + 14 H2O -> 16 H+ + 8 SO4^2- + 4 Fe(OH)3 (v)}$

The product Fe(OH)_{3}, iron(III) hydroxide (orange), precipitates as a solid, insoluble mineral by which the alkalinity component is immobilized, while the acidity remains active in the sulfuric acid. The process of acidification is accompanied by the formation of high amounts of aluminium (Al^{3+}, released from clay minerals under influence of the acidity), which are harmful to vegetation. Other products of the chemical reaction are:

1. Hydrogen sulfide (H_{2}S), a foul-smelling gas
2. Sulfur (S), a yellow solid
3. Iron(II) sulfide (FeS), a black/gray/blue solid
4. Hematite (Fe_{2}O_{3}), a red solid
5. Goethite ($\ce{FeO.OH}$), a brown mineral
6. Iron sulfate compounds (e.g., jarosite, schwertmannite, gypsum, and epsomite)
7. H-Clay (hydrogen clay, with a large fraction of adsorbed H^{+} ions, a stable mineral, but poor in nutrients)

The iron can be present in bivalent and trivalent forms (Fe^{2+}, the ferrous ion, and Fe^{3+}, the ferric ion respectively). The ferrous form is soluble in a relatively wide range of pH conditions whereas the ferric form is not soluble except in an extremely acidic environment such as muriatic acid rust remover. The more oxidized the soil becomes, the more the ferric forms dominate. Acid sulfate soils exhibit an array of colors ranging from black, brown, blue-gray, red, orange and yellow. The hydrogen clay can be improved by admitting sea water: the magnesium (Mg) and sodium (Na) in the sea water replaces the adsorbed hydrogen and other exchangeable acidic cations such as aluminium (Al). However this can create additional risks when the hydrogen ions and exchangeable metals are mobilised.

=== Geographical distribution ===
Acid sulfate soils are widespread around coastal regions, and are also locally associated with freshwater wetlands and saline sulfate-rich groundwater in some agricultural areas. In Australia, coastal acid sulfate soils occupy an estimated 58,000 km^{2}, underlying coastal estuaries and floodplains near where the majority of the Australian population lives. Acid sulfate soil disturbance is often associated with dredging, excavation dewatering activities during canal, housing and marina developments. Droughts can also result in acid sulfate soil exposure and acidification.

== Impact ==
Disturbing potential acid sulfate soils can have a destructive effect on plant and fish life, and on aquatic ecosystems. Flushing of acidic leachate to groundwater and surface waters can cause a number of impacts, including:

- Ecological damage to aquatic and riparian ecosystems through fish kills, increased fish disease outbreaks, dominance of acid-tolerant species, precipitation of iron, etc.
- Effects on estuarine fisheries and aquaculture projects (increased disease, loss of spawning area, etc.).
- Contamination of groundwater and surface water with arsenic, aluminium and other metals.
- Reduction in agricultural productivity through metal contamination of soils (predominantly by aluminium).
- Damage to infrastructure through the corrosion of concrete and steel pipes, bridges and other sub-surface assets.

=== Agricultural Impacts ===
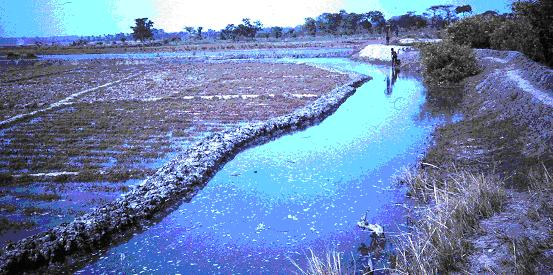
Sea water is admitted to a bunded polder on acid sulfate soil for soil improvement and weed control, Guinea Bissau

Potentially acid sulfate soils (also called cat-clays) are often not cultivated or, if they are, planted with rice, so that the soil can be kept wet preventing oxidation. Subsurface drainage of these soils is normally not advisable.

When cultivated, acid sulfate soils cannot be kept wet continuously because of climatic dry spells and shortages of irrigation water, surface drainage may help to remove the acidic and toxic chemicals (formed in the dry spells) during rainy periods. In the long run surface drainage can help to reclaim acid sulfate soils. The indigenous population of Guinea Bissau has thus managed to develop the soils, but it has taken them many years of careful management and toil.

In an article on cautious land drainage, the author describes the successful application of subsurface drainage in acid sulfate soils in coastal polders of Kerala state, India.

Also in the Sunderbans, West Bengal, India, acid sulfate soils have been taken in agricultural use.

A study in South Kalimantan, Indonesia, in a perhumid climate, has shown that the acid sulfate soils with a widely spaced subsurface drainage system have yielded promising results for the cultivation of upland rice, peanut and soybean. The local population, of old, had already settled in this area and were able to produce a variety of crops (including tree fruits), using hand-dug drains running from the river into the land until reaching the back swamps. The crop yields were modest, but provided enough income to make a decent living.

Reclaimed acid sulfate soils have a well-developed soil structure thanks to the abundance of trivalent cations (mainly Al^{+3}) which have a very strong flocculating effect; they are well permeable, but infertile due to the leaching that has occurred.

In the second half of the 20th century, in many parts of the world, waterlogged and potentially acid sulfate soils have been drained aggressively to make them productive for agriculture. The results were disastrous. The soils are unproductive, the lands look barren and the water is very clear (again, due to the flocculating effect of Al^{+3}), devoid of silt and life. The soils can be colorful, though.

=== Construction ===
When brickwork is persistently wet, as in foundations, retaining walls, parapets and chimneys, sulfates in bricks and mortar may in time crystallise and expand and cause mortar and renderings to disintegrate. To minimise this effect specialised brickwork with low sulfate levels should be used. Acid sulfates that are located within the subsoil strata has the same effects on the foundations of a building. Adequate protection can exist using a polythene sheeting to encase the foundations or using a sulfate-resistant Portland cement. To identify the pH level of the ground a soil investigation must take place.

== Restoration and Management ==
By raising the water table, after damage has been inflicted due to over-intensive drainage, the soils can be restored. The following table gives an example.

Drainage and yield of Malaysian oil palm on acid sulfate soils (after Toh Peng Yin and Poon Yew Chin, 1982)
Yield in tons of fresh fruit per ha:

Year	60	61	62	63	64	65	66	67	68	69	70	71
Yield	17	14	15	12	8	2	4	8	14	19	18	19

Drainage depth and intensity were increased in 1962. The water table was raised again in 1966 to counter negative effects.

In the "millennium drought" in the Murray-Darling Basin in Australia, exposure of acid sulfate soils occurred. Large scale engineering interventions were undertaken to prevent further acidification, including construction of a bund and pumping of water to prevent exposure and acidification of Lake Albert. Management of acidification in the Lower Lakes was also undertaken using aerial limestone dosing.

== Australian Terminology ==
=== Sulphate or Sulfate? ===
Although ‘sulphur’, ‘sulphate’ and ‘sulphide’ are standard Australian-English spellings, Australian researchers are encouraged to adopt the US-English spelling of these terms in both domestic and international publications so that, inter alia, spelling is consistent with IUPAC definitions. As such, although ‘acid sulphate soil’ is commonly encountered in Australian literature, ‘acid sulfate soil’ is now the preferred spelling.

=== History ===
The term ‘acid sulfate soils’ (ASS) was coined by the Working Party on Nomenclature and Methods for the first International Symposium on Acid Sulfate Soils (1972, Wageningen) to mean soils that contain, or have the potential to produce, sulfuric acid in quantities that cause significant and long-lasting changes in key soil properties. This term was gradually adopted by the international scientific community for the sake of international consistency and cooperation. Prior to this, different regions used colloquial terms such as:

- argilla vitriolacea (Latin, ‘clay with sulfuric acid’ – coined by Carl Linnaeus);
- Kattekleigronden or Katte Klei (Dutch, ‘cat clay’);
- Gifterde (German, ‘cursed / poisoned earth’); and
- Maibolt (an Austro-Germanic spirit or creature that, when angered, would curse the soil to spoil crops).

The term ‘acid sulfate soil’ is useful for general discussion, but fails to capture nuances required for technical classification of soils. Additional terms such as ‘potential acid sulfate soil’ (PASS), ‘active acid sulfate soil’ (AASS) and ‘post-active acid sulfate soil’ (PAASS) helped researchers distinguish between the following:

- PASS: non-acidic soils that did not contain substantial quantities of sulfuric acid, but contained the necessary materials to produce it under certain conditions;
- AASS: soils that were acidic due to the presence of sulfuric acid; and
- PAASS: soils that were once active acid sulfate soils, but have since weathered or ‘ripened’ to the point they were similar to ‘normal’ sub-aerial soil in terms of their chemical and physical properties (e.g., pH and drainage).

As a single soil profile may contain PASS, AASS, and PAASS at different depths, the term ‘material’ was added as a modifier (i.e., PASS-material, AASS-material, and PAASS-material) to allow for more nuanced descriptions of complex soils. However, these terms are still somewhat awkward and unsuitable for technical classification. Additionally, 'acid sulfate soils' and the variations thereof imply that acid sulfate soils are an altogether different type or class of soil, rather than a feature soils may exhibit under certain conditions. Consequently, there has been a gradual movement away from these terms in favour of more standardised, operationally defined definitions.

=== Sulfidic and Sulfuric Material ===
The terms ‘sulfidic material’ and ‘sulfuric material’ were primarily coined by Prof Delvin Fanning (University of Maryland), Prof Martin Rabenhorst (University of Maryland), and Prof Rob Fitzpatrick (University of Adelaide) – and have been incorporated into the Australian Soil Classification (ASC) and World Reference Base (WRB) as diagnostic features of soil. For example, under the ASC, a Sulfuric Extratidal Hydrosol would refer to a soil that is saturated for 2-3 months of the year (i.e., a Hydrosol), located in an extratidal setting, and which contains sulfuric material. Therefore, acid sulfate soils may be described more technically as soils that contain sulfidic and/or sulfuric material.

Sulfuric material refers to soil material that has a pH of less than 4 owing to the oxidation of sulfidic material.

Sulfidic material refers to “soil materials containing detectable inorganic sulfides (≥0.01% sulfidic sulfur) that can exist as horizons or layers at least 30 mm thick or as surficial features”, and is further divided into 3 classes: hyposulfidic, hypersulfidic, and monosulfidic.

Conceptually, hyposulfidic and hypersulfidic materials are used to distinguish between sulfidic material that, respectively, would not and would experience a drop in pH to below 4 if exposed to prevailing oxidising conditions. By definition, hyposulfidic material does not convert to sulfuric material upon oxidation.

In contrast to both hyposulfidic and hypersulfidic materials, monosulfidic material contains high concentrations of detectable monosulfides (≥ 0.01% acid volatile sulfide) (e.g., greigite and mackinawite). Note that monosulfidic material has not replaced Monosulfidic Black Ooze (MBO), which is now considered a type of monosulfidic material.

The terms ‘sulfidisation’ and ‘sulfuricisation’ were coined to refer to the formation of sulfidic and sulfuric material, respectively. Although the terms have not been formally adopted in the ASC, their use is encouraged in Australia. However, the terms should not be used synonymously with other terms that also refer to the formation or transformation of sulfides (e.g., pyritization). Similarly, 'sulfidic material' should not be used interchangeably with similar terms such as pyritic/sulfidic sediment, rock and regolith, which may be found in publications on Acid Rock systems. The broad term 'sulfidic geomedia' could be used to refer to both sulfidic material and pyritic/sulfidic sediment, rock and regolith; but it has no formal definition in Australia and should not be used in lieu of 'sulfidic material'.

=== 'Self-Neutralising' Acid Sulfate Soils ===
The term 'self-neutralising' acid sulfate soils has been used to refer to sulfidic material which does not become acidic upon oxidation due to the presence of alkaline materials (e.g., marine carbonates) - which neutralise acidity generated by the oxidation of sulfidic material.

The use of this term is discouraged as it can give the impression that the soil is not hazardous. Although the aerobic weathering of hyposulfidic material does not produce excess acidity, it typically generates a saline solution containing environmentally hazardous concentrations of metals and metalloids.Therefore, 'hyposulfidic material' should be used instead of 'self-neutralising acid sulfate soil'.

== Australian Guidance and Other Resources ==
=== Overview ===
An array of technical manuals, maps, databases, and other forms of guidance for identifying, sampling, and/or managing acid sulfate soils have been published by Federal and State/Territory governments over the years. National Acid sulfate soils guidance: a synthesis provides a summary of available guidance. It is recommended that those not familiar with available guidance first consult this document. An overview is also available on the Commonwealth Water Quality Australia website. Key, publicly available resources are described below.

=== National Acid Sulfate Soil Guidance ===
Identification, sampling and analysis of acid sulfate soils should be conducted in line with:

- the National acid sulfate soils sampling and identification methods manual;
- the National acid sulfate soils identification and laboratory methods manual; and
- the National Environment Protection (Assessment of Site Contamination) Measure 1999 (Cth) ('Site Contamination NEPM').

The Site Contamination NEPM is not specific to acid sulfate soils and is not discussed here.

The national sampling and identification manual provides: background information on acid sulfate soil formation and disturbance processes and environmental impacts; the minimum requirements of a desktop assessment and site inspection; and a guide to sampling and field testing.

Key features of the national laboratory methods manual are:

- the action criteria triggering the need for an Acid Sulfate Soil Management Plan (ASSMP);
- a description of the key pools of actual and potential acidity; an overview of the hazards associated with the disturbance of acid sulfate soils (e.g., acidification, deoxygenation, and salinisation of soil/water systems, and mobilisation of metals/metalloids); and
- a description of the standard analytical techniques used to quantify these hazards (e.g., Acid Base Accounting, Acid Volatile Sulfide analysis, and sequential metal/metalloid extraction).

These manuals do not provide guidance on the management of acid sulfate soils. For topic-specific management strategies see:

- Guidance for the Dredging of Acid Sulfate Soil Sediments and Associated Dredge Spoil Management;
- Guidance for the Dewatering of Acid Sulfate Soils in Shallow Groundwater Environments; and
- Overview and Management of Monosulfidic Black Ooze (MBO) Accumulation in Waterways and Wetlands.

These documents are comprehensive and publicly available through the Water Quality Australia website.

=== Queensland Guidance ===
The Queensland Acid Sulfate Soil Technical Manual: Soil Management Guidelines is highly recommended for both scientists and engineers due to its excellent discussion on risk assessment and management strategies. Management strategies discussed in the manual include: avoidance, minimisation of disturbance, neutralisation, hydraulic separation, strategic reburial / interment, and stockpiling.

The Queensland government Acid Sulfate Soils: Laboratory Methods Guidelines is recommended for a discussion on the analytical techniques. Although the National guidance constitutes the primary authority on the subject, and covers a broader range of issues, this manual provides more commentary on the analytical techniques such as SPOCAS.

=== Western Australia Guidance ===
The Treatment and management of soils and water in acid sulfate soil landscapes provides an overview of acid sulfate soil management strategies – including a discussion on groundwater management (which is not covered in the Queensland technical manual).

=== Fitzpatrick and Shand (2008) ===
Inland acid sulfate soil systems across Australia: CRC LEME Open File Report 249 (Fitzpatrick and Shand, 2008) provides a comprehensive introduction to the subject as well as more detailed discussion on select aspects such as the mineralogy of and toxic gas emissions from acid sulfate soils. The report also contains a range of Australian case studies that demonstrate environmental and community health hazards posed by acid sulfate soils, and how these hazards were or were not effectively managed.

== Acid Base Accounting ==
=== Overview ===
Acid Base Accounting (ABA), namely, the practice of quantifying sources of acidity and alkalinity, is a critical aspect of managing acid sulfate soils. For example, ABA is used to calculate the amount of neutralising agent (e.g., lime) required to neutralise stockpiled sulfidic material generated from excavation or dredging activities.

The standard Australian ABA system describes three operationally defined pools of acidity (mol H^{+} per tonne dry soil).

Potential Sulfidic Acidity (PSA) is a measure of the ‘oxidisable sulfur’ associated with Reduced Inorganic Sulfur (RIS) (e.g., iron sulfides and elemental sulfur) that may oxidise to produce sulfuric acid.

Titratable Actual Acidity (TAA) is a measure of soluble and exchangeable acidity associated with organic acids and loosely bound Al^{3+} and Fe^{3+} ions – which react with water to produce H^{+} (i.e., hydrolysis).

Retained Acidity (RA) is a measure of sparingly soluble sulfates such as jarosite and schwertmannite, which slowly generate acidity via the release and hydrolysis of Al^{3+} and Fe^{3+}.

The Acid Neutralising Capacity (ANC) of the soil sample is subtracted from the sum of the PSA, TAA and RA to calculate the net acidity. ANC is typically associated with carbonates and, to a lesser extent, organic matter.

In Australia, net acidity is used in combination with the texture or clay content of the sample and the weight of acid sulfate soil to be disturbed (e.g., excavated for construction) to determine whether or not an Acid Sulfate Soil Management Plan (ASSMP) is required as part of statutory environmental management protocols.

=== Estimation of Potential Sulfidic Acidity: S_{CR} and S_{POS} ===
Potential Sulfidic Acidity (PSA) is a function of the concentration of Reduced Inorganic Sulfur (RIS) in a soil sample. If RIS were the only pool of sulfur present in a sample, PSA could be directly estimated from the total concentration of sulfur. In some cases this may possible. However, sulfate minerals (e.g., gypsum, epsomite, and jarosite) and organic matter typically constitute additional sources of sulfur in most sulfidic and sulfuric soils. Chromium Reducible Sulfur (S_{CR} or CRS) accurately measures RIS without significant interference from these other sources of sulfur. The chromium reduction method is summarized in Soil Chemical Methods:

The Cr reduction method… is based on the conversion of reduced inorganic S to H_{2}S by a hot acidic CrCl_{2} solution; the evolved gas is trapped quantitatively in a Zn acetate solution as solid ZnS. The ZnS is then treated with HCl to release H_{2}S into solution, which must then be quickly titrated with I_{2} solution to the blue-coloured end point indicated by the reaction of I_{2} with starch.

Another common measure of PSA - Peroxide Oxidisable Sulfur (S_{POS}) - is calculated as the difference between the sulfur determined via peroxide digestion (S_{p}) and sulfur extracted with a 1 M KCl solution (S_{KCl}).

S_{KCl} is a measure of sulfur associated with relativity soluble sulfates (e.g., gypsum and epsomite). S_{p} is a measure of sulfur associated with both RIS and organic matter. As such, S_{POS} may overestimate PSA where samples contain even relatively small amounts of organic matter. Therefore, S_{CR} is recommended for samples containing > 0.06% organic carbon.

Neither S_{CR} nor S_{POS} provide a measure of sulfur associated with sparingly soluble sulfate minerals such as jarosite.

=== Chromium Reducible Sulfur v SPOCAS ===
Suspension Peroxide Oxidation Combined Acidity and Sulfur (SPOCAS) method is a suite of tests used to determine the net acidity via the measurement of: Titratable Peroxide Acidity (TPA) (as a measure of PSA); Titratable Actual Acidity (TAA); Excess Acid Neutralising Capacity (ANC_{E}); and Residual Acid Soluble Sulfur (S_{RAS}) or Net Acid-Soluble Sulfur (S_{NAS}) (as measures of retained acidity).

As SPOCAS is effectively a self-contained ABA test, it is very useful and popular. However, the use of peroxide digestion for TPA may overestimate PSA where organic matter is present (see discussion on S_{POS}). Therefore, it is recommended to measure S_{CR} for at least one sample per batch of samples to determine if there is a substantial discrepancy between PSA measured via S_{CR} and TPA. Additionally, note that S_{RAS} does not reliably measure the concentration of jarosite or schwertmannite (the typical sources of retained acidity); and S_{NAS} typically only accounts for 50-60% of jarosite. Consequently, S_{NAS} should be doubled to obtain a more accurate measure of Retained Acidity where jarosite is likely the principal source of Retained Acidity (which is the usual case). This calculation may or may not be performed by commercial labs before they present the ABA results to the client.

Retained Acidity is a very recalcitrant pool of acidity in that it is slow to release and not easily neutralised. Therefore, soils with high amounts of Retained Acidity may require special management considerations to mitigate gradual acidification over tens to hundreds of years.

=== Preservation of Acid Sulfate Soil Samples ===
Oxidation of RIS occurs rapidly under ambient conditions This is especially true for iron monosulfides, which have a higher surface area than iron disulfides.

Monosulfidic material will change from pitch black to light brown within minutes of being exposed to air (see images below). Consequently, acid sulfate soil samples should be immediately cooled to < 4°C to slow oxidation; and samples containing monosulfidic material should be immediately frozen (e.g., using a portable freezer or liquid nitrogen). The use of dry ice is recommended as the gaseous carbon dioxide should further hinder oxidation. Samples should be tested for ABA within 24 h of sampling. Otherwise, additional preservation techniques (e.g., freezing or drying at > 85°C) should be used.

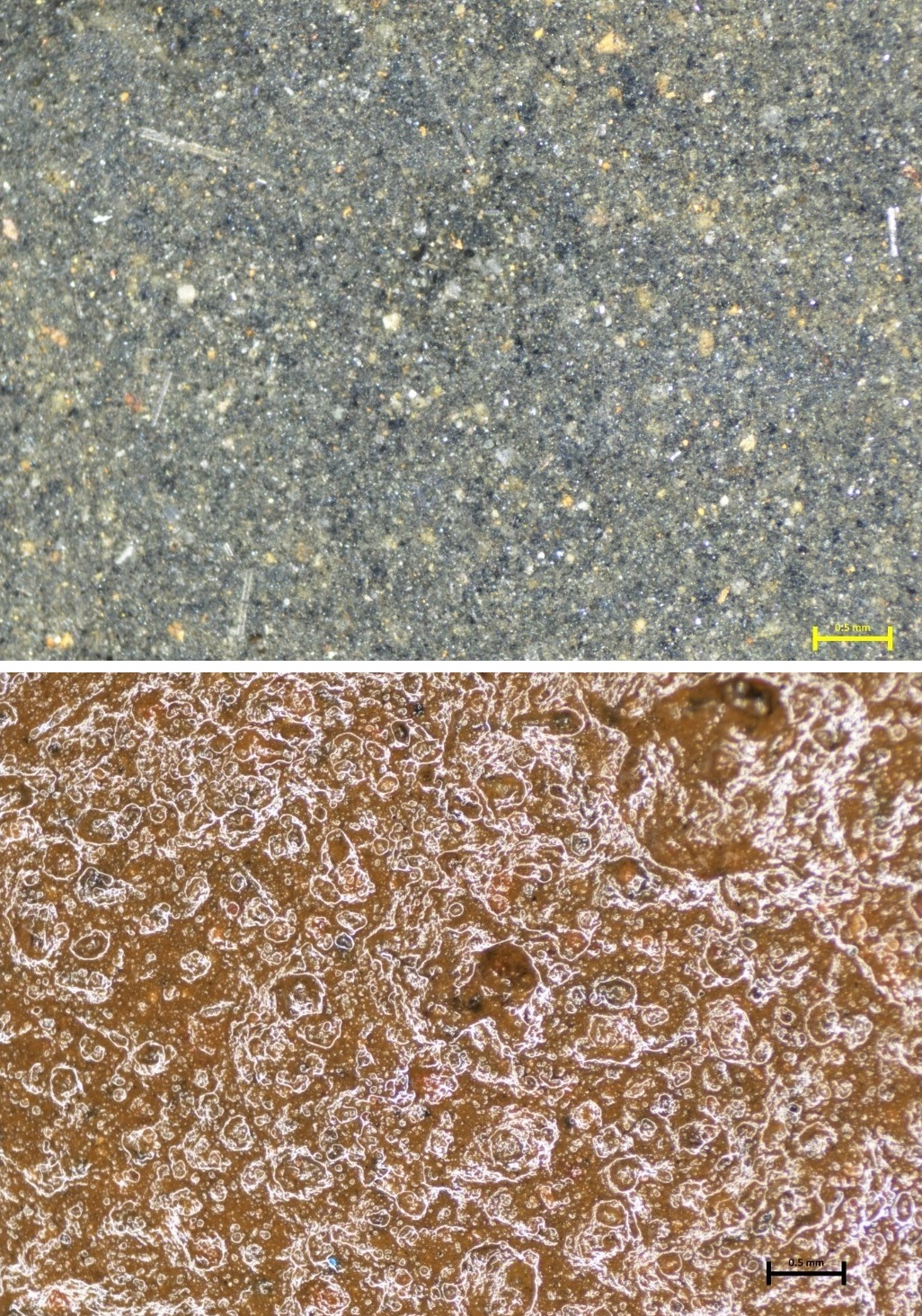
Top - monosulfidic material under water. Bottom - same monosulfidic material 5 min after water was removed. Colour change from black to brown is the result of the rapid oxidation of iron monosulfides. Scale bar represents 0.5mm.

== See also ==
- Acid mine drainage
- Estuarine acidification
- Soil pH
