= Environmental flow =

Environmental flows describe the quantity, timing, and quality of water flows required to sustain freshwater and estuarine ecosystems and the human livelihoods and well being that depend on these ecosystems. In the Indian context river flows required for cultural and spiritual needs assumes significance. Through implementation of environmental flows, water managers strive to achieve a flow regime, or pattern, that provides for human uses and maintains the essential processes required to support healthy river ecosystems. Environmental flows do not necessarily require restoring the natural, pristine flow patterns that would occur absent human development, use, and diversion but, instead, are intended to produce a broader set of values and benefits from rivers than from management focused strictly on water supply, energy, recreation, or flood control.

Rivers are parts of integrated systems that include floodplains and riparian corridors. Collectively these systems provide a large suite of benefits. However, the world's rivers are increasingly being altered through the construction of dams, diversions, and levees. More than half of the world's large rivers are dammed, a figure that continues to increase. Almost 1,000 dams are planned or under construction in South America and 50 new dams are planned on China's Yangtze River alone. The construction of small hydropower dams is significant. Dams and other river structures change the downstream flow patterns and consequently affect water quality, temperature, sediment movement and deposition, fish and wildlife, and the livelihoods of people who depend on healthy river ecosystems. Environmental flows seek to maintain these river functions while at the same time providing for traditional offstream benefits.

== Evolution of environmental flow concepts and recognition ==
From the turn of the 20th century through the 1960s, water management in developed nations focused largely on maximizing flood protection, water supplies, and hydropower generation. During the 1970s, the ecological and economic effects of these projects prompted scientists to seek ways to modify dam operations to maintain certain fish species. The initial focus was on determining the minimum flow necessary to preserve an individual species, such as trout, in a river. Environmental flows evolved from this concept of "minimum flows" and, later, "instream flows", which emphasized the need to keep water within waterways.

By the 1990s, scientists came to realize that the biological and social systems supported by rivers are too complicated to be summarized by a single minimum flow requirement. Since the 1990s, restoring and maintaining more comprehensive environmental flows has gained increasing support, as has the capability of scientists and engineers to define these flows to maintain the full spectrum of riverine species, processes and services. Furthermore, implementation has evolved from dam reoperation to an integration of all aspects of water management, including groundwater and surface water diversions and return flows, as well as land use and storm water management. The science to support regional-scale environmental flow determination and management has likewise advanced.

In a global survey of water specialists undertaken in 2003 to gauge perceptions of environmental flow, 88% of the 272 respondents agreed that the concept is essential for sustainably managing water resources and meeting the long-term needs of people. In 2007, the Brisbane Declaration on Environmental Flows was endorsed by more than 750 practitioners from more than 50 countries. The declaration announced an official pledge to work together to protect and restore the world's rivers and lakes. By 2010, many countries throughout the world had adopted environmental flow policies, although their implementation remains a challenge. Environmental flows are viewed as one approach to helping curb the loss of freshwater biodiversity.

== Examples ==
One effort currently underway to restore environmental flows is the Sustainable Rivers Project, a collaboration between The Nature Conservancy (TNC) and U.S. Army Corps of Engineers (USACE), which is the largest water manager in the United States. Since 2002, TNC and the USACE have been working to define and implement environmental flows by altering the operations of USACE dams in 8 rivers across 12 states. Dam reoperation to release environmental flows, in combination with floodplain restoration, has in some instances increased the water available for hydropower production while reducing flood risk.

Arizona's Bill Williams River, flowing downstream of Alamo Dam, is one of the rivers featured in the Sustainable Rivers Project. Having discussed modifying dam operations since the early 1990s, local stakeholders began to work with TNC and USACE in 2005 to identify specific strategies for improving the ecological health and biodiversity of the river basin downstream from the dam. Scientists compiled the best available information and worked together to define environmental flows for the Bill Williams River. While not all of the recommended environmental flow components could be implemented immediately, the USACE has changed its operations of Alamo Dam to incorporate more natural low flows and controlled floods. Ongoing monitoring is capturing resulting ecological responses such as rejuvenation of native willow-cottonwood forest, suppression of invasive and non-native tamarisk, restoration of more natural densities of beaver dams and associated lotic-lentic habitat, changes in aquatic insect populations, and enhanced groundwater recharge. USACE engineers continue to consult with scientists on a regular basis and use the monitoring results to further refine operations of the dam.

Another case in which stakeholders developed environmental flow recommendations is Honduras' Patuca III Hydropower Project. The Patuca River, the second longest river in Central America, has supported fish populations, nourished crops, and enabled navigation for many indigenous communities, including the Tawahka, Pech, and Miskito Indians, for hundreds of years. To protect the ecological health of the largest undisturbed rainforest north of the Amazon and its inhabitants, TNC and Empresa Nacional de Energía Eléctrica (ENEE, the agency responsible for the project) agreed to study and determine flows necessary to sustain the health of human and natural communities along the river. Due to very limited available data, innovative approaches were developed for estimating flow needs based on experiences and observations of the local people who depend on this nearly pristine river reach.

== Methods, tools, and models ==
More than 200 methods are used worldwide to prescribe river flows needed to maintain healthy rivers. However, very few of these are comprehensive and holistic, accounting for seasonal and inter-annual flow variation needed to support the whole range of ecosystem services that healthy rivers provide. Such comprehensive approaches include DRIFT (Downstream Response to Imposed Flow Transformation), BBM (Building Block Methodology), and the "Savannah Process" for site-specific environmental flow assessment, and ELOHA (Ecological Limits of Hydrologic Alteration) for regional-scale water resource planning and management.

The "best" method, or more likely, methods, for a given situation depends on the amount of resources and data available, the most important issues, and the level of certainty required. To facilitate environmental flow prescriptions, a number of computer models and tools have been developed by groups such as the USACE's Hydrologic Engineering Center to capture flow requirements defined in a workshop setting (e.g., HEC-RPT) or to evaluate the implications of environmental flow implementation (e.g., HEC-ResSim, HEC-RAS, and HEC-EFM).

Additionally, a 2D model is developed from a 3D turbulence model based on Smagorinsky large eddy closure to more appropriately model environmental large scale flows. This model is based on a slow manifold of the turbulent Smagorinsky large eddy closure instead of conventional depth-averaged flow equations.

Other tried and tested environmental flow assessment methods include DRIFT, which was recently used in the Kishenganga HPP dispute between Pakistan and India at the International Court of Arbitration.

== In India ==
In India, the need for environmental flows has emerged from the hundreds of large dams being planned in the Himalayan rivers for hydro power generation. The cascades of dams planned across the Lohit, Dibang River in the Brahmaputra River, the Alaknanda and Bhagirathi River in the Ganga basin and the Teesta in Sikkim for example, would end up in the rivers flowing more through tunnels and pen stocks rather than the river channels.

There have been some recommendations by various authorities (Courts, Tribunals, Expert Appraisal Committee of the Ministry of Environment and Forests (India)) on releasing e-flows from dams. However, these recommendations have never been backed by strong objectives about why certain e-flow releases are needed.

== See also ==
- Freshwater inflow
- Water scarcity
