= Nonlinear tides =

Hydrodynamic distortions of tides

Nonlinear tides are generated by hydrodynamic distortions of tides. A tidal wave is said to be nonlinear when its shape deviates from a pure sinusoidal wave. In mathematical terms, the wave owes its nonlinearity due to the nonlinear advection and frictional terms in the governing equations. These become more important in shallow-water regions such as in estuaries. Nonlinear tides are studied in the fields of coastal morphodynamics, coastal engineering and physical oceanography. The nonlinearity of tides has important implications for the transport of sediment.

== Framework ==
From a mathematical perspective, the nonlinearity of tides originates from the nonlinear terms present in the Navier-Stokes equations. In order to analyse tides, it is more practical to consider the depth-averaged shallow water equations:
$$\frac{\partial \eta}{\partial t}+\frac{\partial}{\partial x}[(D_0 + \eta )u]+\frac{\partial}{\partial y}[(D_0 + \eta )v]=0,$$
$$\frac{\partial u}{\partial t}+u\frac{\partial u}{\partial x}+v\frac{\partial u}{\partial y}=-g\frac{\partial \eta}{\partial x}-\frac{\tau_{b,x}}{\rho (D_0 + \eta )},$$
$$\frac{\partial v}{\partial t}+u\frac{\partial v}{\partial x}+v\frac{\partial v}{\partial y}=-g\frac{\partial \eta}{\partial y}-\frac{\tau_{b,y}}{\rho (D_0 +\eta )}.$$
Here, $u$ and $v$ are the zonal ($x$) and meridional ($y$) flow velocity respectively, $g$ is the gravitational acceleration, $\rho$ is the density, $\tau_{b,x}$ and $\tau_{b,y}$ are the components of the bottom drag in the $x$- and $y$-direction respectively, $D_0$ is the average water depth and $\eta$ is the water surface elevation with respect to the mean water level. The former of the three equations is referred to as the continuity equation while the others represent the momentum balance in the $x$- and $y$-direction respectively.

These equations follow from the assumptions that water is incompressible, that water does not cross the bottom or surface and that pressure variations above the surface are negligible. The latter allows the pressure gradient terms in the standard Navier-Stokes equations to be replaced by gradients in $\eta$. Furthermore, the coriolis and molecular mixing terms are omitted in the equations above since they are relatively small at the temporal and spatial scale of tides in shallow waters.

For didactic purposes, the remainder of this article only considers a one-dimensional flow with a propagating tidal wave in the positive $x$-direction.This implies that $v=0$ zero and is all quantities are homogeneous in the $y$-direction. Therefore, all $\partial / \partial y$ terms equal zero and the latter of the above equations is arbitrary.

=== Nonlinear contributions ===
In this one dimensional case, the nonlinear tides are induced by three nonlinear terms. That is, the divergence term $\partial(\eta u)/\partial x$, the advection term $u\; \partial u/\partial x$, and the frictional term $\tau_b/(D_0+\eta)$. The latter is nonlinear in two ways. Firstly, because $\tau_b$ is (nearly) quadratic in $u$ . Secondly, because of $\eta$ in the denominator. The effect of the advection and divergence term, and the frictional term are analysed separately. Additionally, nonlinear effects of basin topography, such as intertidal area and flow curvature can induce specific kinds of nonlinearity. Furthermore, mean flow, e.g. by river discharge, may alter the effects of tidal deformation processes.

=== Harmonic analysis ===
A tidal wave can often be described as a sum of harmonic waves. The principal tide (1st harmonic) refers to the wave which is induced by a tidal force, for example the diurnal or semi-diurnal tide. The latter is often referred to as the $M_2$ tide and will be used throughout the remainder of this article as the principal tide. The higher harmonics in a tidal signal are generated by nonlinear effects. Thus, harmonic analysis is used as a tool to understand the effect the nonlinear deformation. One could say that the deformation dissipates energy from the principal tide to its higher harmonics. For the sake of consistency, higher harmonics having a frequency that is an even or odd multiple of the principle tide may be referred to as the even or odd higher harmonics respectively.

== Divergence and advection ==
In order to understand the nonlinearity induced by the divergence term, one could consider the propagation speed of a shallow water wave. Neglecting friction, the wave speed is given as:

$$c_0 \approx \sqrt{g(D_0+\eta)}$$

Comparing low water (LW) to high water (HW) levels ($\eta_{LW}<\eta_{HW}$), the through (LW) of a shallow water wave travels slower than the crest (HW). As a result, the crest "catches up" with the trough and a tidal wave becomes asymmetric.

In order to understand the nonlinearity induced by the advection term, one could consider the amplitude of the tidal current. Neglecting friction, the tidal current amplitude is given as:

$$U_0 \approx c_0 \frac{\eta}{D_0}$$

When the tidal range is not small compared to the water depth, i.e. $\eta/D_0$ is significant, the flow velocity $u$ is not negligible with respect to $c_0$. Thus, wave propagation speed at the crest is $c_0 +u$ while at the trough, the wave speed is $c_0 -u$. Similar to the deformation induced by the divergence term, this results in a crest "catching up" with the trough such that the tidal wave becomes asymmetric.

For both the nonlinear divergence and advection term, the deformation is asymmetric. This implies that even higher harmonics are generated, which are asymmetric around the node of the principal tide.

=== Mathematical analysis ===
The linearized shallow water equations are based on the assumption that the amplitude of the sea level variations are much smaller than the overall depth. This assumption does not necessarily hold in shallow water regions. When neglecting the friction, the nonlinear one-dimensional shallow water equations read:
$$\frac{\partial \eta}{\partial t}+\underbrace{u\frac{\partial \eta}{\partial x}}_i+(D_{0}+\underbrace{\eta)\frac{\partial u}{\partial x}}_i=0,$$
$$\frac{\partial u}{\partial t}+\underbrace{u\frac{\partial u}{\partial x}}_{ii}=-g\frac{\partial \eta}{\partial x}.$$
Here $D_{0}$ is the undisturbed water depth, which is assumed to be constant. These equations contain three nonlinear terms, of which two originate from the mass flux in the continuity equation (denoted with subscript $i$), and one originates from advection incorporated in the momentum equation (denoted with subscript $ii$). To analyze this set of nonlinear partial differential equations, the governing equations can be transformed in a nondimensional form. This is done based on the assumption that $u$ and $\eta$ are described by a propagating water wave, with a water level amplitude $H_0$, a radian frequency $\omega$ and a wavenumber $k$. Based on this, the following transformation principles are applied:
$$\left\{
\begin{array}{ll}
x=\frac{1}{k}\tilde{x}\\
\eta=H_{0}\tilde{\eta}\\
t=\frac{1}{\omega}\tilde{t}\\
u=H_{0}\sqrt{\frac{g}{D_0}}\tilde{u}
\end{array}
\right.$$
The non-dimensional variables, denoted by the tildes, are multiplied with an appropriate length, time or velocity scale of the dimensional variable. Plugging in the non-dimensional variables, the governing equations read:
$$\frac{\partial \tilde{\eta}}{\partial \tilde{t}}+\frac{H_{0}}{D_0}\tilde{u}\frac{\partial \tilde{\eta}}{\partial \tilde{x}}+(1+\frac{H_{0}}{D_{0}}\tilde{\eta})\frac{\partial \tilde{u}}{\partial \tilde{x}}=0$$
$$\frac{\partial \tilde{u}}{\partial \tilde{t}}+\frac{H_{0}}{D_{0}}\tilde{u}\frac{\partial \tilde{u}}{\partial \tilde{x}}=-\frac{\partial \tilde{\eta}}{\partial\tilde{ x}}$$
The nondimensionalization shows that the nonlinear terms are very small if the average water depth is much larger than the water level variations, i.e. $\frac{H_{0}}{D_{0}}$ is small. In the case that $H_0/D_0 <<1$, a linear perturbation analysis can be used to further analyze this set of equations. This analysis assumes small perturbations around a mean state of $\mathcal{O}(1)$:
$$\left\{
\begin{array}{ll}
\tilde{\eta}=\tilde{\eta}_0+\epsilon \tilde{\eta}_1+\mathcal{O}(\epsilon^2)\\
\tilde{u}={\tilde u}_0+\epsilon \tilde{u}_1+\mathcal{O}(\epsilon^2)
\end{array}
\right.$$
Here $\epsilon=H_0/D_0$.

When inserting this linear series in the nondimensional governing equations, the zero-order terms are governed by:
$$\frac{\partial {\tilde{\eta}_0}}{\partial \tilde{t}}+\frac{\partial \tilde{u}_0}{\partial \tilde{x}}=0$$
$$\frac{\partial {\tilde u}_0}{\partial \tilde{t}}+\frac{\partial {\tilde \eta}_0}{\partial \tilde{x}}=0$$
This is a linear wave equation with a simple solution of form:

$$\left\{
\begin{array}{ll}
{\tilde \eta}_{0}(\tilde {x},\tilde{t})=\cos(\tilde{x}-\tilde{t})\\
{\tilde{u}}_0(\tilde {x},\tilde{t})=\cos(\tilde{x}-\tilde{t})
\end{array}
\right.$$
Collecting the $\mathcal{O}(\epsilon)$ terms and dividing by $\epsilon$ yields:

$$\frac{\partial \tilde{\eta}_1}{\partial \tilde{t}}+\frac{\partial \tilde{u}_1}{\partial \tilde x}+\tilde{\eta}_0 \frac{\partial \tilde{u}_0}{\partial \tilde x}+\tilde{u}_0\frac{\partial \tilde{\eta}_0}{\partial \tilde{x}}=0$$
$$\frac{\partial \tilde{u}_1}{\partial \tilde{t}}+\tilde{u}_0\frac{\partial \tilde{u}_0}{\partial \tilde{x}}=-\frac{\partial \tilde{\eta}_1}{\partial \tilde{x}}$$
Three nonlinear terms remain. However, the nonlinear terms only involve terms of $\mathcal{O}(1)$, for which the solutions are known. Hence these can be worked out. Subsequently, taking the $\tilde{t}$-derivative of the upper and subtracting the $\tilde{x}$-derivative of the lower equation yields a single wave equation:

$$\frac{\partial^2 \tilde{\eta}_1}{\partial \tilde{t}^2}-\frac{\partial^2 \tilde{\eta}_1}{\partial \tilde{x}^2}=-3\cos(2(\tilde{x}-\tilde{t}))$$

This linear inhomogenous partial differential equation, obeys the following particulate solution:

$$\left\{
\begin{array}{ll}
\tilde{\eta}_{1}(\tilde {x},\tilde{t})=\frac{3}{4}\tilde{x}\sin(2(\tilde{x}-\tilde{t}))\\
{\tilde u}_1(\tilde {x},\tilde{t})=\frac{3}{4}\tilde{x}\sin(2(\tilde{x}-\tilde{t}))
\end{array}
\right.$$

Returning to the dimensional solution for the sea surface elevation (e.g.):

$$\eta=H_0\cos(kx-\omega t)+\frac{3}{4}\frac{H_0^2kx}{D_0}\sin(2(kx-\omega t))$$

Animation of tidal deformation by nonlinear advection terms. The upper panel shows the principal tide, the middle panel the generated higher harmonic and the lower panel is the sum of the two above.

This solution is valid for a first order perturbation. The nonlinear terms are responsible for creating a higher harmonic signal with double the frequency of the principal tide. Furthermore, the higher harmonic term scales with $x$, $H_0/D_0$ and $k$. Hence, the shape of the wave will deviate more and more from its original shape when propagating in the $x$-direction, for a relatively large tidal range and for shorter wavelengths. When considering a common principal $M2$ tide, the nonlinear terms in the equation lead to the generation of the $M_4$ harmonic. When considering higher-order $\epsilon$ terms, one would also find higher harmonics.

== Friction ==
The frictional term in the shallow water equations, is nonlinear in both the velocity and water depth.

In order to understand the latter, one can infer from the $\tau_b/(D_0+\eta)$ term that the friction is strongest for lower water levels. Therefore, the crest "catches up" with the trough because it experiences less friction to slow it down. Similar to the nonlinearity induced by the divergence and advection term, this causes an asymmetrical tidal wave.

In order to understand the nonlinear effect of the velocity, one should consider that the bottom stress is often parametrized quadratically:
$$\tau_{b}=\rho C_{d}u|u|$$
Here $C_{d}$ is the drag coefficient, which is often assumed to be constant ($C_d=0.0025$).

Twice per tidal cycle, at peak flood and peak ebb, $|u|$ reaches a maximum, . However, the sign of $u|u|$ is opposite for these two moments. Causally, the flow is altered symmetrical around the wave node. This leads to the conclusion that this nonlinearity results in odd higher harmonics, which are symmetric around the node of the principal tide.

=== Mathematical analysis ===
==== Nonlinearity in velocity ====
The parametrization of $\tau_{b}$ contains the product of the velocity vector with its magnitude. At a fixed location, a principal tide is considered with a flow velocity:

$$u=U_0cos(\omega t)$$

Here, $U_0$ is the flow velocity amplitude and $\omega$ is the angular frequency. To investigate the effect of bottom friction on the velocity, the friction parameterization can be developed into a Fourier series:

$$\tau_{b}=\rho C_{d} U_{0}^2\left(\frac{2}{\pi}\cos(\omega t)+\frac{2}{\pi}\sum_{n=1}^{a}\frac{\left(-1\right)^{n}}{1-4n^{2}}(\cos\left(\omega t(2n+1))+\cos(\omega t(2n-1))\right)\right)=\rho C_{d} U_{0}^2 (\frac{8}{3\pi}cos(\omega t)+\frac{8}{15\pi}cos(3\omega t)+...)$$

This shows that $\tau_{b}$ can be described as a Fourier series containing only odd multiples of the principal tide with frequency $\omega_2$. Hence, the frictional force causes an energy dissipation of the principal tide towards higher harmonics. In the two dimensional case, also even harmonics are possible. The above equation for $\tau_{b}$ implies that the magnitude of the friction is proportional to the velocity amplitude $U_{0}^2$. Meaning that stronger currents experience more friction and thus more tidal deformation. In shallow waters, higher currents are required to accommodate for sea surface elevation change, causing more energy dissipation to odd higher harmonics of the principal tide.

==== Nonlinearity in water depth ====
Although not very accurate, one can use a linear parameterization of the bottom stress:

$\tau_b =\rho \; \hat{r}u$

Here $\hat{r}$ is a friction factor which represents the first Fourier component of the more exact quadratical parameterization. Neglecting the advectional term and using the linear parameterization in the frictional term, the nondimensional governing equations read:
$$\frac{\partial \tilde{\eta}}{\partial \tilde{t}}+\frac{\partial \tilde{u}}{\partial \tilde{x}}=0$$
$$\frac{\partial \tilde{u}}{\partial \tilde{t}}=-\frac{\partial \tilde{\eta}}{\partial\tilde{ x}}-\frac{\hat{r}\tilde{u}}{\omega D_0(1+\frac{H_0}{D_0}\tilde{\eta})}$$
Despite the linear parameterization of the bottom stress, the frictional term remains nonlinear. This is due to the time dependent water depth $D_0 +\eta$ in its denominator. Similar to the analysis of the nonlinear advection term, a linear perturbation analysis can be used to analyse the frictional nonlinearity. The $\mathcal{O}(1)$ equations are given as:
$$\frac{\partial {\eta_0}}{\partial \tilde{t}}+\frac{\partial u_0}{\partial \tilde{x}}=0$$
$$\frac{\partial u_0}{\partial \tilde{t}}+\frac{\partial \eta_0}{\partial \tilde{x}}=-\frac{\hat{r}u_{0}}{\omega D_0}$$
Taking the $\tilde{t}$-derivative of the upper equation and subtracting the $\tilde{x}$-derivative of the lower equation, the $u_0$ terms can be eliminated. Calling $\frac{\hat{r}}{\omega D_0}=\lambda$, this yield a single second order partial differential equation in $\eta_0$:
$$-\left(\frac{\partial^2}{\partial \tilde{t}^2}+\lambda\frac{\partial }{\partial \tilde{t}}-\frac{\partial^2}{\partial \tilde{x}^2}\right)\eta_0 = 0$$
In order to solve this, boundary conditions are required. These can be formulated as
$$\left\{
\begin{array}{ll}
\eta_{0}(0,\tilde{t})=\cos(\tilde{t})\\
\frac{\partial \eta_0}{\partial \tilde{x}}(kL,\tilde{t})=0
\end{array}
\right.$$
The boundary conditions are formulated based on a pure cosine wave entering a domain with length $L$. The boundary ($x=L$) of this domain is impermeable to water. To solve the partial differential equation, a separation of variable method can be used. It is assumed that $\eta_0(\tilde{x},\tilde{t})=\mathfrak{Re}(\hat{\eta}_0(\tilde{x})e^{-it})$. A solution that obeys the partial differential equation and the boundary conditions, reads:
$$\left\{
\begin{array}{ll}
\hat{\eta}_{0}(\tilde{x})=\frac{\cos(\mu(\tilde{x}-kL))}{\cos({\mu kL})}\\
\hat{u}_{0}(\tilde{x})=-i\frac{\sin(\mu(\tilde{x}-kL))}{\cos({\mu kL})}
\end{array}
\right.$$
Here, $\mu=\sqrt{1+i\lambda}$.

In a similar manner, the $\mathcal{O}(\epsilon)$ equations can be determined:
$$\frac{\partial {\eta_1}}{\partial \tilde{t}}+\frac{\partial u_1}{\partial \tilde{x}}=0$$
$$\frac{\partial u_1}{\partial \tilde{t}}+\frac{\partial \eta_1}{\partial \tilde{x}}+\frac{\hat{r}u_1}{\omega D_0}=\frac{\hat{r}u_{0}\eta_0}{\omega D_0}$$
Here the friction term was developed into a Taylor series, resulting in two friction terms, one of which is nonlinear. The nonlinear friction term contains a multiplication of two $\mathcal{O}(1)$ terms, which show wave-like behaviour. The real parts of $\eta_0(\tilde{x},\tilde{t})$ and $u_0(\tilde{x},\tilde{t})$ are given as:
$$\eta_0(\tilde{x},\tilde{t})=\frac{1}{2}\hat{\eta}_0e^{-it}+\frac{1}{2}\hat{\eta}_0^*e^{it}$$
$$u_0(\tilde{x},\tilde{t})=\frac{1}{2}\hat{u}_0e^{-it}+\frac{1}{2}\hat{u}_0^*e^{it}$$
Here the $*$ denote a complex conjugate. Inserting these identities into the nonlinear friction term, this becomes:

$$\frac{\hat{r}u_{0}\eta_0}{\omega D_0}=\frac{\hat{r}}{4\omega D_0}(\hat{u}_0^*\hat{\eta}_0+\hat{u}_0\hat{\eta}_0^*)+\frac{\hat{r}}{4\omega D_0}(\hat{u}_0\hat{\eta}_0e^{-2it}+\hat{u}_0^*\hat{\eta}_0^*e^{2it})$$
The above equation suggests that the particulate solution of the first order terms obeys a particulate solution with a time-independent residual flow $M_0$ (quantities denoted with subscript $0$) and a higher harmonic with double the frequency of the principal tide, e.g. if the principal tide has a $M_2$ frequency, the double linearity in the friction will generate an $M_4$ component. The residual flow component represents Stokes drift. Friction causes higher flow velocities in the high water wave than in the low water, hence making the water parcels move in the direction of the wave propagation. When higher order terms in the perturbation analysis are considered, even higher harmonics will also be generated.

== Intertidal area ==
Schematic diagram of estuary cross sections and the corresponding tidal asymmetry. In estuary (i) the change in channel depth, $h$, dominates over the change in estuary width, $b$. Therefore, the high tide (HT) wave speed is larger than the low tide (LT) wave speed. This causes tidal asymmetry with a relatively fast rising tide. In estuary (ii) the change in estuary width, $b$, dominates over the change in channel dept, $h$. Therefore, the high tide wave speed is smaller than the low tide wave speed. This causes tidal asymmetry with a relatively slow rising tide.

In a shallow estuary, nonlinear terms play an important role and might cause tidal asymmetry. This can intuitively be understood when considering that if the water depth is smaller, the friction slows down the tidal wave more. For an estuary with small intertidal area (case i), the average water depth generally increases during the rising tide. Therefore, the crest of the tidal wave experiences less friction to slow it down and it catches up with the trough. This causes tidal asymmetry with a relatively fast rising tide. For an estuary with much intertidal area (case ii), the water depth in the main channel also increases during the rising tide. However, because of the intertidal area, the width averaged water depth generally deceases. Therefore, the trough of the tidal wave experiences relatively little friction slowing it down and it catches up on the crest. This causes tidal asymmetry with a relatively slow rising tide. For a friction dominated estuary, the flood phase corresponds to the rising tide and the ebb phase corresponds to the falling tide. Therefore, case (i) and (ii) correspond to a flood and ebb dominated tide respectively.

In order to find a mathematical expression to find the type of asymmetry in an estuary, the wave speed should be considered. Following a non-linear perturbation analysis, the time-dependent wave speed for a convergent estuary is given as:

$$c(t) \sim \frac{h(t)}{b(t)^2} \approx \frac{\langle h\rangle[1+(\eta/H_0)(H_0/\langle h\rangle)]}{\langle b\rangle^{1/2}[1+(\eta/H_0)(\Delta b/\langle b\rangle)]^{1/2}}$$

With $h(t)$ the channel depth, $b(t)$ the estuary width, and the right side just a decomposition of these quantities in their tidal averages (denote by the $\langle \rangle$) and their deviation from it. Using a first order Taylor expansion, this can be simplified to:

$$c \sim \frac{\langle h\rangle}{\langle b\rangle^{1/2}}[1+\gamma(\eta/H_{0})]$$

Here:

$$\gamma = \frac{H_0}{\langle h\rangle}-\frac{1}{2}\frac{\Delta b}{\langle b\rangle }$$

This parameter represents the tidal asymmetry. The discussed case (i), i.e. fast rising tide, corresponds to $\gamma>0$, while case (ii), i.e. slow rising tide, corresponds to $\gamma<0$. Nonlinear numerical simulations by Friedrichs and Aubrey reproduce a similar relationship for $\gamma$.

== Flow curvature ==
Schematic top view of water flow around a curved coast induced by a tidal force in the x-direction. The left side of the coast is convex and the right side is concave. The solid arrows represent the water stream lines and the dashed arrows represent the pressure gradient force.

Consider a tidal flow induced by a tidal force in the x-direction such as in the figure. Far away from the coast, the flow will be in the x-direction only. Since at the coast the water cannot flow cross-shore, the streamlines are parallel to the coast. Therefore, the flow curves around the coast. The centripetal force to accommodate for this change in the momentum budget is the pressure gradient perpendicular to a streamline. This is induced by a gradient in the sea level height. Analogues to the gravity force that keeps planets in their orbit, the gradient in sea level height for a streamline curvature with radius $r$ is given as:

$$g \frac{\partial \eta}{\partial r} = \frac{u^2}{r}$$

For a convex coast, this corresponds to a decreasing water level height when approaching the coast. For a concave coast this is opposite, such that the sea level height increases when approaching the coast. This pattern is the same when the tide reverses the current. Therefore, one finds that the flow curvature lowers or raises the water level height twice per tidal cycle. Hence it adds a tidal constituent with a frequency twice that of the principal component. This higher harmonic is indicative of nonlinearity, but this is also observed by the quadratic term in the above expression.

== Mean flow ==
A mean flow, e.g. a river flow, can alter the nonlinear effects. Considering a river inflow into an estuary, the river flow will cause a decrease of the flood flow velocities, while increasing the ebb flow velocities. Since the friction scales quadratically with the flow velocities, the increase in friction is larger for the ebb flow velocities than the decrease for the flood flow velocities. Hence, creating a higher harmonic with double the frequency of the principal tide. When the mean flow is larger than the amplitude of the tidal current, this would lead to no reversal of the flow direction. Thus, the generation of the odd higher harmonics by the nonlinearity in the friction would be reduced. Moreover, an increase in the mean flow discharge can cause an increase in the mean water depth and therefore reduce the relative importance of nonlinear deformation.

== Example: Severn Estuary ==
Water level amplitude of the $M_4$ and $M_6$ harmonics plotted against the $M_2$ water level amplitude in 2011at the measuring station near Avonmouth.

The Severn Estuary is relatively shallow and its tidal range is relatively large. Therefore, nonlinear tidal deformation is notable in this estuary. Using GESLA data of the water level height at the measuring station near Avonmouth, the presence of nonlinear tides can be confirmed. Using a simple harmonic fitting algorithm with a moving time window of 25 hours, the water level amplitude of different tidal constituents can be found. For 2011, this has been done for the $M_2$, $M_4$ and $M_6$ constituents. In the figure, the water level amplitude of the $M_4$ and $M_6$ harmonics, $H_{M4}$ and $H_{M6}$ respectively, are plotted against the water level amplitude of the principal $M_2$ tide, $H_{M2}$. It can be observed that higher harmonics, being generated by nonlinearity, are significant with respect to the principal tide.

The correlation between $H_{M2}$ and $H_{M4}$ looks somewhat quadratic. This quadratic dependence could be expected from the mathematical analysis in this article. Firstly, the analysis of divergence and advection results in an expression that, for a fixed $x$, implies:

$H_{M4} \propto H_{M2}^2$

Secondly, the analysis of the nonlinearity of the friction in the water depth yields a second higher harmonic. For the mathematical analysis, a linear parameterization of the bottom stress was assumed. However, the bottom stress actually scales nearly quadratically with the flow velocity. This is reflected in the quadratic relation between $H_{M2}$ and $H_{M4}$.

In the graph, for a small tidal range, the correlation between $H_{M2}$ and $H_{M6}$ is approximately directly proportional. This relation between the principal tide and its third harmonic follows from the nonlinearity of the friction in the velocity, which is reflected in the derived expression. For larger tidal ranges, $H_{M6}$ start decreasing. This behaviour remains unresolved by the theory covered in this article.

== Sediment transport ==
The deformation of tides can be of significant importance in sediment transport. In order to analyse this, it is obvious to distinguish between the dynamics of suspended sediment and bed load sediment. Suspended sediment transport (in one dimension) can in general be quantified as:

$$q_{s}=\int_{z_b+a_r}^\eta (uc-K_{b}\frac{\partial c}{\partial z})dz$$

Here $q_{s}$ is the depth integrated sediment flux, $c$ is the sediment concentration, $K_b$ is the horizontal diffusivity coefficient and $a_{r}$ is the reference height above the surface $z_{b}$. The bed load transport can be estimated by the following heuristic definition:

$$q_b=\beta u^3$$
Here $\beta$ is an erosion coefficient.

The zonal flow velocity can be represented as a truncated Fourier series. When considering a tidal flow composed of only $M_2$ and $M_4$ constituents, the current at a specific location is given as:
$$u(t)=U_{M2}\cos(\omega_{M2}t-\phi_{M2})+U_{M4}\cos(\omega_{M4}t-\phi_{M4}).$$
A description of the local evolution of the suspended sediment concentration is required to obtain an expression for the tidally averaged suspended sediment flux. The local change of the depth integrated suspended sediment concentration ($C=\int^{\eta}_{z_{b}+a_r}c dz$) is governed by:
$$\frac{\partial C}{\partial t}=\alpha u^{2}-\frac{W_s^2}{K_v}C$$

Here $W_s$ is the fall velocity, $K_v$ is the vertical diffusivity coefficient and $\alpha$ is an erosion coefficient. Advection is neglected in this model. Considering the definition of $u(t)$ and $C$, an expression for the tidally averaged bed and suspended load transport can be obtained:
$$\langle q_s\rangle=\frac{K_v\alpha}{W_s^{2}}(\frac{1}{4}U_{M2}^2U_{M4}\cos(2 \phi_{M2}-\phi_{M4})(\frac{2}{1+a^{2}}+\frac{1}{1+4a^2})+
\frac{a}{2}U_{M2}^{2}U_{M4}\sin(2\phi_{M2}-\phi_{M4})(\frac{2}{1+a^{2}}+\frac{1}{1+4a^2}))$$
$$\langle q_b\rangle=\frac{3\beta}{4}U^{2}_{M2}U_{M4}\cos(2\phi_{M2}-\phi_{M4})$$
Here $a=\frac{\omega_{M2}K_v^2}{W_s}$, the ratio of the settling time scale over the tidal time scale. Two important mechanisms can be identified using the definitions of $\langle q_b\rangle$ and $\langle q_s\rangle$. These two transport mechanisms are discussed shortly.

=== Velocity asymmetry ===
The velocity asymmetry mechanism relies on a difference in maximum flow velocity between peak ebb and flood. The quantification of this mechanism is encapsulated by the $\cos(2\phi_{M2}-\phi_{M4})$ term. The implications of this term are summarized in the table below:

$2\phi_{M2}-\phi_{M4}$	$\langle q_s\rangle_{va}$	$\langle q_b\rangle_{va}$
$\pm \; 90^\circ$	0	0
$0^\circ \le |2\phi_{M2}-\phi_{M2}|<90^\circ$	$>0$	$>0$
$90^\circ<|2\phi_{M2}-\phi_{M2}|\le 180^\circ$	$<0$	$<0$

Velocity asymmetry and duration asymmetry of tide by $M_4$ harmonic. The type of asymmetry and the sign of $\langle q \rangle$ is determined by the relative phase difference $2\phi_{M2} - \phi_{M4}$

Hence, the velocity asymmetry mechanism causes a net ebb directed transport if the absolute value of the relative phase difference$|2\phi_{M2}-\phi_{M4}|>90^\circ$, while it causes a net flood directed transport if $|2\phi_{M2}-\phi_{M4}|<90^\circ$ . In the latter case, peak flood flows will be larger than peak ebb flows. Hence, the sediment will be transported over a larger distance in the flood direction, making $\langle q_s\rangle >0$ and $\langle q_b\rangle>0$. The opposite applies for $|2\phi_{M2}-\phi_{M4}|<90^\circ$.

=== Duration asymmetry ===
The duration asymmetry mechanism can also cause a tidally averaged suspended load transport. This mechanism only allows for a tidally averaged suspended sediment flux. The quantification of this mechanism is encapsulated by the $\sin(2\phi_{M2}-\phi_{M4})$ term, which is absent in the $\langle q_b\rangle$ equation. The implications of this term are summarized in the table below:

$2\phi_{M2}-\phi_{M4}$	$\langle q_s\rangle_{da}$
$0^\circ$	0
$0^\circ<2\phi_{M2}-\phi_{M4}<180^\circ$	$>0$
$180^\circ<2\phi_{M2}-\phi_{M4}<360^\circ$	$<0$

When $0^\circ<2\phi_{M2}-\phi_{M4}<180^\circ$, the time from peak flood to peak ebb is longer than the time from peak ebb to peak flood. This makes that more sediment can settle during the period from peak flood to peak ebb, hence less sediment will be suspended at peak ebb and there will be a net transport in the flood direction. A similar, but opposite explanation holds for $180^\circ<2\phi_{M2}-\phi_{M4}<360^\circ$. Bed load transport is not affected by this mechanism because the mechanism requires a settling lag of the particles, i.e. the particles must take time to settle and the concentration adapts gradually to the flow velocities.

== See also ==
- Tidal resonance
- Tidal bore
- Wave nonlinearity
- Tides in marginal seas
- Sediment transport
