= Estuary freshwater inflow =

Freshwater flowing into an estuary

Estuary freshwater inflow is the freshwater that flows into an estuary. Other types of environmental flows include instream flow, the freshwater flowing in rivers or streams, and estuary outflow, the outflow from an estuary to the ocean.

== Estuaries ==
Freshwater inflow: Freshwater flows into an estuary and mixes with the marine water of the estuarine ecosystem. The mixing of freshwater inflow and the marine water of the estuarine ecosystem occurs spatially and temporally from climatic influences including tidal action, seasonal variability and storms. Mixing is affected by the amount of estuarine system. The tides and the volume of the receiving estuary govern the volume of seawater. Tides are defined as the periodic rise and fall of the surface of the sea along the coast that are driven by the gravitational pull of the moon and of the sun. Although estuaries are influenced by the tides, they are often somewhat protected from storms and tidal action by buffers further offshore including barrier islands and peninsulas.

The low-salinity conditions of the marine water are created when freshwater mixes with the saltwater of the estuarine system. Average [salinity] for freshwater is around 0.5 parts per thousand (ppt) whereas average salinity of the ocean is 35 ppt. Salinity will not be consistent throughout a particular estuary and will differ from one estuary to the next, but its level will range from 0.5 ppt to 35 ppt. In estuaries, primary producers take up nutrients such as nitrogen and phosphorus. Freshwater inflows carry estuaries, replenishing the stock for phytoplankton use. Sediments settling out and form banks, offshore peninsulas, and barrier islands that protect the estuary from strong tidal action and currents. The sediment also supports beaches and provision the inter-tidal wetlands. Organic material delivered to estuaries by freshwater inflows the primary energy source for organisms living in the estuary. Estuarine ecosystems need freshwater inflow to maintain their productivity, or to continue to produce biomass.

Estuarine ecosystems are fundamentally important and necessary to protect through the management of freshwater inflow because of the many ecosystem services they produce. An ecosystem service is something provided by nature that is of value to humans. Estuarine ecosystems are among the most productive ecosystems on the planet. Estuaries house such species as the blue crab, red fish, flounder, spotted seatrout, and many others for some point of the species’ life cycle. Marine habitats, such as those found in estuarine ecosystems, are valued at providing an estimated US14$ trillion worth of ecosystem goods and services annually, or 43% of the global total. Some economically important estuarine habitats include tidal flats, salt marshes, sea grass beds, oyster reefs, and mangroves. This is why estuaries are important to protect and conserve.

== Global change ==
Global changes caused largely by anthropogenic influences, or human impacts, are altering the amount of freshwater inflows to estuaries. Humans are diverting water from rivers and streams, decreasing the amount of flows making it to estuarine ecosystems. Since the 1960s dewatering, or removal of water from streams and rivers, has doubled and around 60% of the Earth’s runoff is captured. The removal of freshwater from rivers and streams for anthropogenic use before it reaches the coast is having a negative impact on many estuaries. Half of the world’s major cities are within 50 km of the coast, and coastal populations are 2.6 times denser than those further inland. Technological advances in the collection of freshwater is continually improving, further straining available freshwater resources. As the human population grows and the strain on water resources continues, the ability to effectively manage freshwater inflows into estuaries is becoming a priority worldwide.

=== Dewatering ===
Changes in freshwater inflow have resulted in losses of habitat, biodiversity, and productivity. Studies also found changes in bioindicator species community’s biomass correlated with changing freshwater inflows, which indicates secondary production changes with altered inflows. These studies suggest the health of the estuary depends on freshwater inflow.

Below is an example of how an upstream human diversion creates cascading effects downstream.

== Freshwater inflow management ==
Many different methodologies aimed at freshwater inflow management to maintain an estuary have been implemented throughout the world. Studies are aimed at determining the freshwater inflow amount necessary to maintain an estuarine ecosystem. One common methodology implemented in studies in several U.S. states including Texas, Florida, and California is to indirectly link estuarine resources (i.e. integrity- species composition, biomass, diversity; function- primary production, secondary production, nutrient recycling; sustainability- habitats, valued resources, ecosystem services) to freshwater inflow (i.e. quantity- timing, frequency, duration, extent; quality; tidal connections) through estuarine conditions (i.e. salinity; sediment; dissolved material; particulate material).

In the Mtata Estuary of South Africa, an Estuarine Health Index is used to compare the current state of the estuary to a predicted reference state. In the Caloosahatchee Estuary in Florida, the range of inflow that protects key biota, or the animal and plant life of a region, determines the necessary amount of freshwater inflow. The methodologies for managing freshwater inflow differ slightly but the main goal is to ultimately create or maintain a sustainable estuary.

== Using ecosystem-based management (EBM) strategies for freshwater inflow oversight ==
Freshwater inflow management strategies require an all-encompassing approach that incorporates a large amount of data on multiple levels. This type of approach is called an ecosystem-based management strategy. Ecosystem-based management (EBM) strategies require a comprehensive approach to incorporate land, energy, and natural resource use and allocation, involving species management, natural commodities, and humans as components. EBM also incorporates data analysis of various interactions over different amounts of time and space. This may be directed at the maintenance or enhancement of the entire riverine ecosystem, including its various aquatic and riparian biota and components from source to sea. Below are some examples of current ecosystem-based management freshwater inflow resources from Texas.

Ecosystem-Based Management Freshwater Inflow Resources from Texas

Resources	Organization	Overview
Freshwater Inflow Tool	HRI	Provides information for understanding and managing freshwater inflow
TX Environmental Flow Program (SB3)	TCEQ	Provides links to all existing reports regarding freshwater inflow
Senate Bill 3 Nueces BBASC	BBASC	Explains SB3 process and provides specific Nueces applications (BBEST and BBASC reports)
NERR Science Collaborative	MANERR	Project to address climate change by helping to establish freshwater inflow requirements
Freshwater Inflows and Estuaries	TPWD	Case studies of methodologies to estimate changes, impacts, and needs of freshwater inflows
Environmental Flows Information System for Texas	CRWR	Data models and database to determine environmental flow needs
