= Estuarine acidification =

Reducing pH values in coastal marine ecosystems

Estuarine acidification happens when the pH balance of water in coastal marine ecosystems, specifically those of estuaries, decreases. Water, generally considered neutral on the pH scale, normally perfectly balanced between alkalinity and acidity. While ocean acidification occurs due to the ongoing decrease in the pH of the Earth's oceans, caused by the absorption of carbon dioxide (CO_{2}) from the atmosphere, pH change in estuaries is more complicated than in the open ocean due to direct impacts from land run-off, human impact, and coastal current dynamics. In the ocean, wave and wind movement allows carbon dioxide (CO_{2}) to mix with water (H_{2}O) forming carbonic acid (H_{2}CO_{3}). Through wave motion this chemical bond is mixed up, allowing for the further break of the bond, eventually becoming carbonate (CO_{3}) which is basic and helps form shells for ocean creatures, and two hydron molecules. This creates the potential for acidic threat since hydron ions readily bond with any Lewis Structure to form an acidic bond. This is referred to as an oxidation-reduction reaction.

The basic chemical equation is as follows:

CO_{2} + H_{2}O ⇌ H_{2}CO_{3} ⇌ HCO_{3} + H^{+} ⇌ CO_{3} + 2 H^{+}

When this pattern of absorption is transferred into an estuary, however, acidity increases simply due to relative volume. Ocean water counts for the absorption of 30-40 percent of all CO_{2} emitted into the atmosphere and yet, due to its immense volume, it remains relatively resilient. Estuaries - being smaller by volume, sheltered from wave motion, and victim to human impact when in an urban setting - do not readily support the mixing of water, and thereby prevents basic breakdown. When this is combined with CO_{2} from human impact such as car emissions or fertilizers, oxidation more readily occurs due to the overabundance of hydron ions and additional cation, increasing the rate of occurrence and duration of acidification taking place. As the acidity of estuarine water levels continues to fluctuate, several species who use estuaries as spawning nurseries have seen decreases in reproduction levels.

== Causes of variable pH ==
=== Freshwater flow ===
An estuary is defined as "a water passage where the tide meets a river current". The pH of estuaries is highly variable because of freshwater flow from rivers and groundwater, as well as primary productivity (exacerbated by nutrient loading) and coastal upwelling. Fresh water from rivers typically has a lower pH than ocean water (~7 compared to ~8). Seasonal and annual changes in river flow entering an estuary can change the pH by whole units.

=== Photosynthesis and respiration ===
Primary production (plant growth) changes pH on a daily, seasonal, and annual basis. During photosynthesis, carbon dioxide is removed from the water, increasing pH. Organisms release carbon dioxide during respiration. This leads to a daily cycle of increased pH during daylight hours and a decrease in pH during the night, when respiration is dominant. Similarly, pH is higher during the winter when grazing is low compared to productivity.

=== Effluent ===
Many estuaries experience nutrient loading from runoff containing wastewater effluent or fertilizers, natural or artificial. Increased nutrients can stimulate primary productivity and alter the balance between primary productivity and respiration. This process can change pH by whole units within the estuary. Both these processes make it difficult to measure the overall change in pH associated with increased atmospheric carbon dioxide levels. This causes a change in pH by whole units in the estuary. This makes it hard to measure the overall change in pH, as well as the increased atmospheric carbon dioxide levels.

=== Currents ===
Areas with coastal upwelling such as the west coast of North America have experienced increases in acidification due to more acidic deep water upwelling into the estuary. This may have a detrimental effect on the survival of calcifying organisms because the organisms have a much more difficult time forming and maintaining their calcium carbonate shells.

== Impact on marine life ==
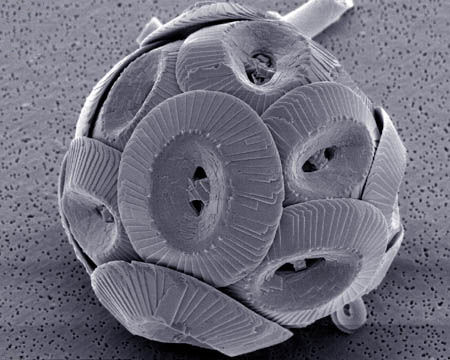
A coccolithophore with many coccoliths (plates) formed from calcium carbonate

As the pH of marine systems decreases, it causes calcium carbonate (CaCO_{3}) to dissociate to keep in chemical equilibrium. Calcium carbonate is vital to calcifying organisms such as shellfish, corals, and coccolithophores (a type of phytoplankton). Acidification also harms micro-organisms in the environment. These organisms either directly provide humans with a food source or supports an ecosystem important to humans.

== Research ==
Estuarine acidification is being studied to understand the biological, chemical, and physical factors that affect pH in estuaries.
