= Framboid =

A framboid is a micromorphological feature common to certain sedimentary minerals, particularly pyrite (FeS_{2}). The first known use of the term is ascribed to Rust in 1935 and is derived from the French 'framboise', meaning 'raspberry', reflecting the appearance of the structure under magnification.

Framboidal structure comprises roughly spherical aggregates of discrete equi-regular euhedral microcrystallites of around 0.5 μm in diameter, with the average aggregate size ranging from 5-20 μm. Framboid diameter tends to correlate positively with microcrystal size, and microcrystal packing is most commonly irregular and disordered. Framboids were once thought to be fossilised bacterial colonies or microorganisms, but successful synthesis of this structure under laboratory conditions and observation of framboids in locations hostile to microbial life have discounted this theory.

Framboidal pyrite is commonly found in coastal sediments, for instance marsh soils, marine and estuarine sediments, and beach sands. It can also be observed in coal as well as magmatic and carbonate rocks. Other minerals known to exhibit framboidal structures include magnetite, hematite, and greigite. Greigite is considered an essential precursor of framboidal pyrite formation.
