= Estuary =

Partially enclosed coastal body of brackish water

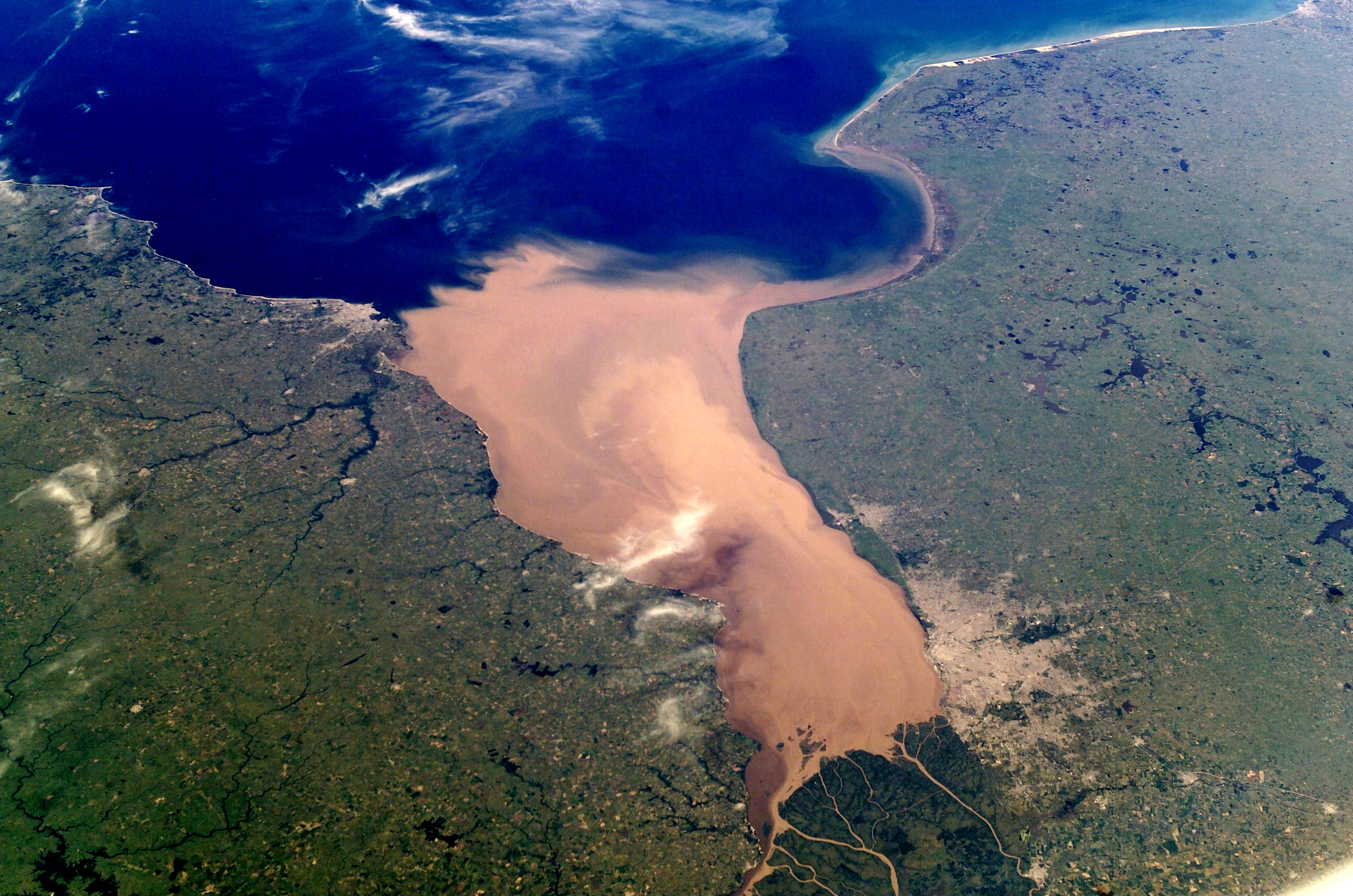
Río de la Plata estuary

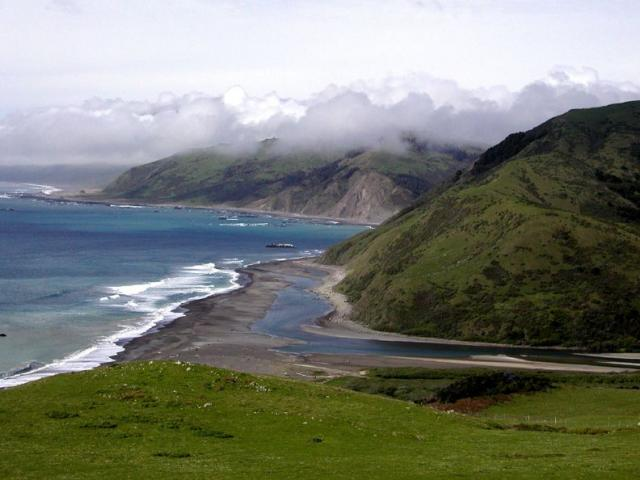
Mattole River estuary

An estuary is a partially enclosed coastal body of brackish water where freshwater from rivers or streams meets and mixes with saltwater from the open sea. Estuaries form transition zones between riverine and marine environments and are classified as ecotones, areas where different ecosystems overlap. They are influenced by both marine processes (such as tides, waves, and saline water intrusion) and fluvial processes (including freshwater flow and sediment input). The mixing of seawater and freshwater provides high levels of nutrients both in the water column and in sediment, making estuaries among the most productive natural habitats in the world.

Most existing estuaries originated during the Holocene epoch with the flooding of river-eroded or glacially scoured valleys when the sea level began to rise about 10,000–12,000 years ago. Estuaries can be classified using four fundamental criteria. These include salinity distribution, geomorphology, water circulation and vertical stratification, and system energetics. They can have many different names, such as bays, harbors, lagoons, inlets, or sounds, although some of these water bodies do not strictly meet the above definition of an estuary and could be fully saline.

Many estuaries suffer degeneration from a variety of factors including soil erosion, deforestation, overgrazing, overfishing and the filling of wetlands. Eutrophication may lead to excessive nutrients from nitrogen run off, sewage and animal wastes; pollutants including heavy metals, polychlorinated biphenyls, radionuclides and hydrocarbons from sewage inputs, and diking or damming for flood control or water diversion.

== Definition ==
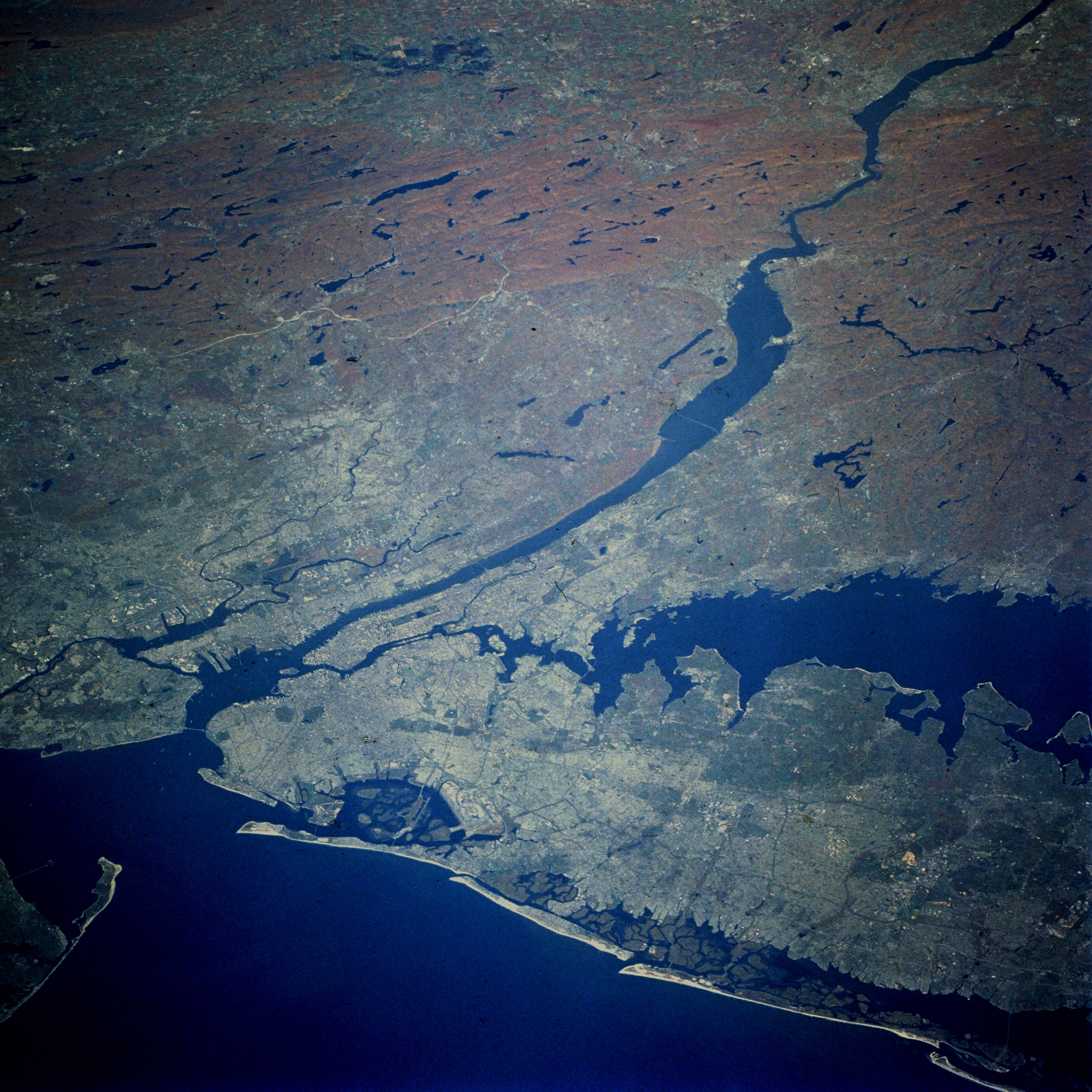
New York–New Jersey Harbor Estuary

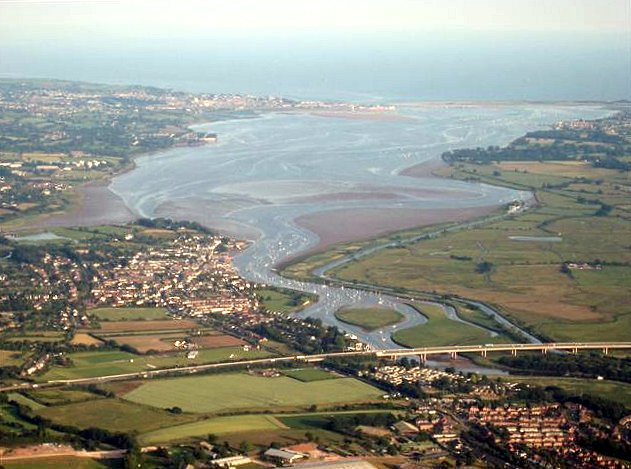
River Exe estuary

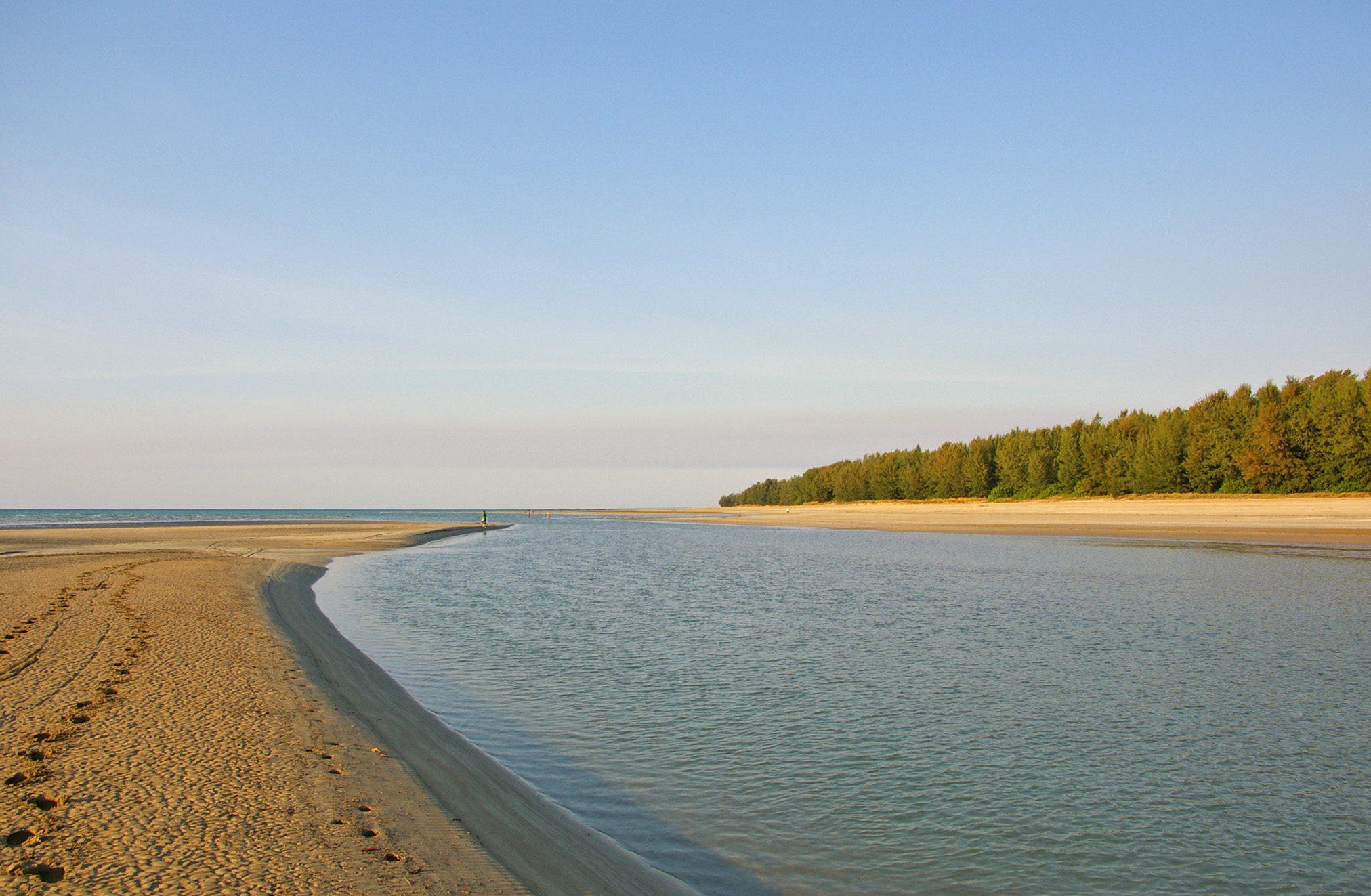
Estuary mouth located in Darwin, Northern Territory, Australia

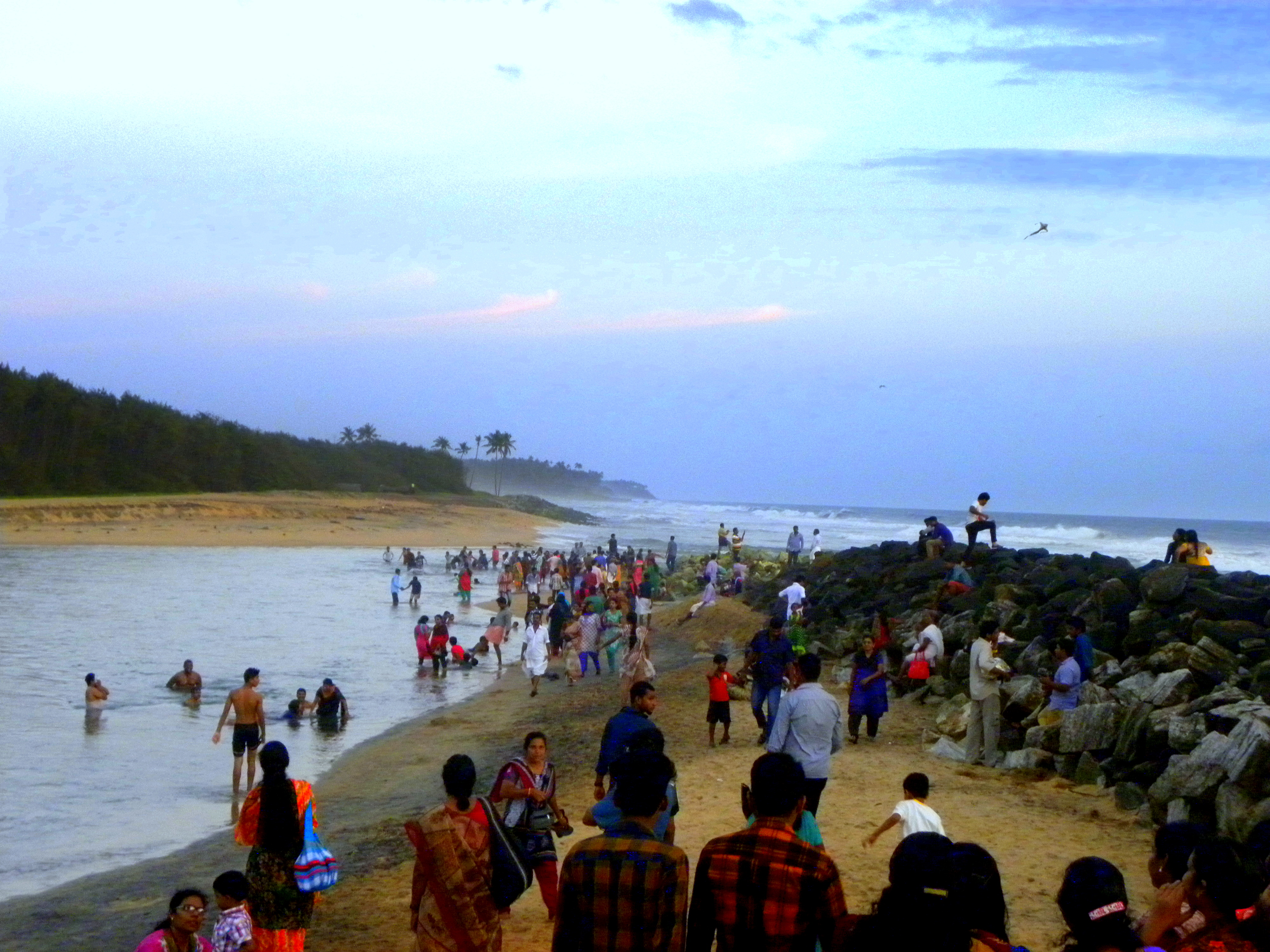
A crowded estuary mouth in Paravur near the city of Kollam, India

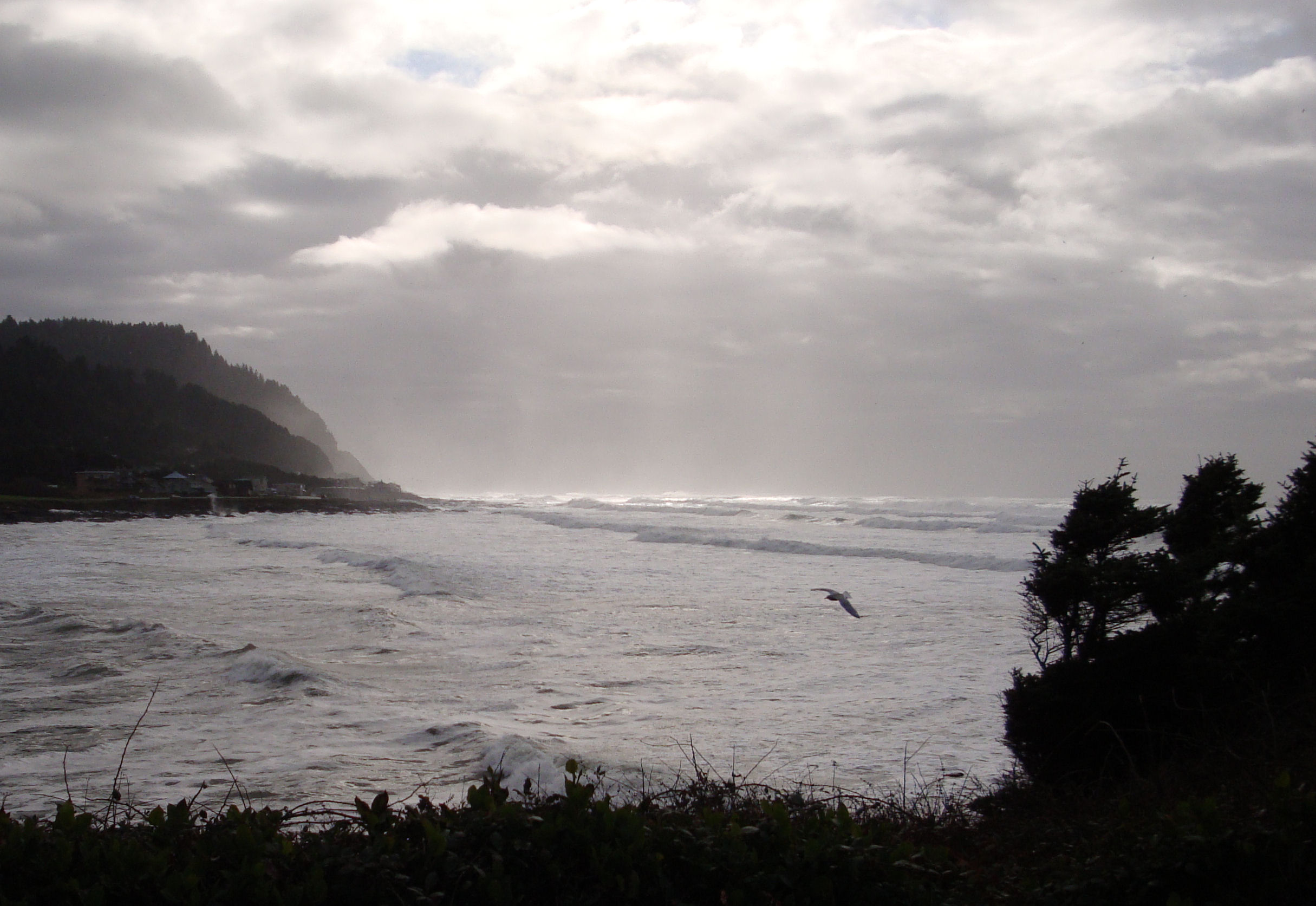
Estuary mouth of the Yachats River in Yachats, Oregon

The word "estuary" is derived from the Latin word aestuarium meaning tidal inlet of the sea, which in itself is derived from the term aestus, meaning tide. There have been many definitions proposed to describe an estuary. The most widely accepted definition is: "a semi-enclosed coastal body of water, which has a free connection with the open sea, and within which seawater is measurably diluted with freshwater derived from land drainage". However, this definition excludes a number of coastal water bodies such as coastal lagoons and brackish seas.

A more comprehensive definition of an estuary is "a semi-enclosed body of water connected to the sea as far as the tidal limit or the salt intrusion limit and receiving freshwater runoff; however the freshwater inflow may not be perennial, the connection to the sea may be closed for part of the year and tidal influence may be negligible". This broad definition also includes fjords, lagoons, river mouths, and tidal creeks.

Overall, an estuary is a dynamic ecosystem having a connection to the open sea through which the sea water enters with the rhythm of the tides. The effects of tides on estuaries can show nonlinear effects on the movement of water which can have important impacts on the ecosystem and waterflow. The seawater entering the estuary is diluted by the fresh water flowing from rivers and streams. The pattern of dilution varies between different estuaries and depends on the volume of freshwater, the tidal range, and the extent of evaporation of the water in the estuary.

== Estuarine ecosystems ==
Estuaries are dynamic coastal ecosystems shaped by the interaction of riverine and marine processes. The mixing of freshwater inflows with oceanic waters creates constantly changing physical and chemical conditions that influence habitat structure, nutrient availability, and biological productivity.

This transitional environment supports a diverse and highly interconnected community of organisms. Species from freshwater, marine, and terrestrial systems coexist and interact within estuaries, forming complex food webs and nutrient cycles. Together, these interactions make estuaries essential ecosystems that maintain biodiversity, regulate environmental processes, and link land, freshwater, and marine environments into a single integrated system.

=== Ecosystem services ===
Estuaries provide a wide range of ecosystem services that sustain both ecological productivity and human well-being. They function as nursery habitats, supporting the early life stages of many marine fish and shellfish, while also maintaining mangroves, seagrasses, salt marshes, and seaweeds that recycle nutrients and support productive fisheries. These ecosystems serve as critical migration corridors for anadromous and catadromous fish.

In addition, estuaries offer habitat for migratory birds and endangered species, enhancing biodiversity and supporting ecotourism opportunities. Water draining from upland areas carries sediments, nutrients, and pollutants into estuaries, where wetlands such as swamps and salt marshes naturally filter these materials improving water clarity and quality for both marine organisms and coastal communities. Vegetation, such as salt marsh grasses, also stabilize shorelines and help reduce erosion, providing a natural buffer against storm impacts and sea-level rise, thereby protecting coastal environments and human infrastructure.

== Classification based on geomorphology ==
=== Drowned river valleys ===
Drowned river valleys are also known as coastal plain estuaries. In places where the sea level is rising relative to the land, sea water progressively penetrates into river valleys and the topography of the estuary remains similar to that of a river valley. This is the most common type of estuary in temperate climates. Well-studied estuaries include the Severn Estuary in the United Kingdom and the Ems Dollard along the Dutch-German border.

The width-to-depth ratio of these estuaries is typically large, appearing wedge-shaped (in cross-section) in the inner part and broadening and deepening seaward. Water depths rarely exceed 30 m (100 ft). Examples of this type of estuary in the U.S. are the Hudson River, Chesapeake Bay, and Delaware Bay along the Mid-Atlantic coast, and Galveston Bay and Tampa Bay along the Gulf Coast.

=== Lagoon-type or bar-built ===
Bar-built estuaries are found in a place where the deposition of sediment has kept pace with rising sea levels so that the estuaries are shallow and separated from the sea by sand spits or barrier islands. They are relatively common in tropical and subtropical locations.

These estuaries are semi-isolated from ocean waters by barrier beaches (barrier islands and barrier spits). Formation of barrier beaches partially encloses the estuary, with only narrow inlets allowing contact with the ocean waters. Bar-built estuaries typically develop on gently sloping plains located along tectonically stable edges of continents and marginal sea coasts. They are extensive along the Atlantic and Gulf coasts of the U.S. in areas with active coastal deposition of sediments and where tidal ranges are less than 4 m (13 ft). The barrier beaches that enclose bar-built estuaries have been developed in several ways:

- building up of offshore bars by wave action, in which sand from the seafloor is deposited in elongated bars parallel to the shoreline,
- reworking of sediment discharge from rivers by a wave, current, and wind action into beaches, overwash flats, and dunes,
- engulfment of mainland beach ridges (ridges developed from the erosion of coastal plain sediments around 5000 years ago) due to sea level rise and resulting in the breaching of the ridges and flooding of the coastal lowlands, forming shallow lagoons,
- elongation of barrier spits from the erosion of headlands due to the action of longshore currents, with the spits growing in the direction of the littoral drift.

=== Fjord-type ===
Fjords were formed where Pleistocene glaciers deepened and widened existing river valleys so that they become U-shaped in cross-sections. At their mouths there are typically rocks, bars or sills of glacial deposits, which have the effects of modifying the estuarine circulation.

Fjord-type estuaries are formed in deeply eroded valleys formed by glaciers. These U-shaped estuaries typically have steep sides, rock bottoms, and underwater sills contoured by glacial movement. The estuary is shallowest at its mouth, where terminal glacial moraines or rock bars form sills that restrict water flow. In the upper reaches of the estuary, the depth can exceed 300 m (1,000 ft). The width-to-depth ratio is generally small. In estuaries with very shallow sills, tidal oscillations only affect the water down to the depth of the sill, and the waters deeper than that may remain stagnant for a very long time, so there is only an occasional exchange of the deep water of the estuary with the ocean. If the sill depth is deep, water circulation is less restricted, and there is a slow but steady exchange of water between the estuary and the ocean. Fjord-type estuaries can be found along the coasts of Alaska, the Puget Sound region of western Washington state, British Columbia, eastern Canada, Greenland, Iceland, New Zealand, Chile, and Norway.

=== Tectonically produced ===
These estuaries are formed by subsidence or land cut off from the ocean by land movement associated with faulting, volcanoes, and landslides. Inundation from eustatic sea-level rise during the Holocene Epoch has also contributed to the formation of these estuaries. There are only a small number of tectonically produced estuaries; one example is the San Francisco Bay, which was formed by the crustal movements of the San Andreas Fault system causing the inundation of the lower reaches of the Sacramento and San Joaquin rivers.

== Classification based on water circulation ==
=== Salt wedge ===
In this type of estuary, river output greatly exceeds marine input and tidal effects have minor importance. Freshwater floats on top of the seawater in a layer that gradually thins as it moves seaward. The denser seawater moves landward along the bottom of the estuary, forming a wedge-shaped layer that is thinner as it approaches land. As a velocity difference develops between the two layers, shear forces generate internal waves at the interface, mixing the seawater upward with the freshwater. Examples of salt wedge estuaries are the Mississippi River and the Mandovi estuary in Goa during the monsoon period.

=== Partially mixed ===
As tidal forcing increases, river output becomes less than the marine input. Here, current induced turbulence causes mixing of the whole water column such that salinity varies more longitudinally rather than vertically, leading to a moderately stratified condition. Examples include the Chesapeake Bay and Narragansett Bay.

=== Well-mixed ===
Tidal mixing forces exceed river output, resulting in a well-mixed water column and the disappearance of the vertical salinity gradient. The freshwater-seawater boundary is eliminated due to the intense turbulent mixing and eddy effects. The lower reaches of Delaware Bay and the Raritan River in New Jersey are examples of vertically homogeneous estuaries.

=== Inverse ===
Inverse estuaries occur in dry climates where evaporation greatly exceeds the inflow of freshwater. A salinity maximum zone is formed, and both riverine and oceanic water flow close to the surface towards this zone. This water is pushed downward and spreads along the bottom in both the seaward and landward direction. Examples of an inverse estuary are Spencer Gulf, South Australia, Saloum River and Casamance River, Senegal.

=== Intermittent ===
Estuary type varies dramatically depending on freshwater input, and is capable of changing from a wholly marine embayment to any of the other estuary types.

== Physiochemical variation ==
The most important variable characteristics of estuary water are the concentration of dissolved oxygen, salinity and sediment load. There is extreme spatial variability in salinity, with a range of near-zero at the tidal limit of tributary rivers to 3.4% at the estuary mouth. At any one point, the salinity will vary considerably over time and seasons, making it a harsh environment for organisms. Sediment often settles in intertidal mudflats which are extremely difficult to colonize. No points of attachment exist for algae, so vegetation based habitat is not established. Sediment can also clog feeding and respiratory structures of species, and special adaptations exist within mudflat species to cope with this problem. Lastly, dissolved oxygen variation can cause problems for life forms. Nutrient-rich sediment from human-made sources can promote primary production life cycles, perhaps leading to eventual decay removing the dissolved oxygen from the water; thus hypoxic or anoxic zones can develop.

== Implications of eutrophication on estuaries ==
=== Effects of eutrophication on biogeochemical cycles ===
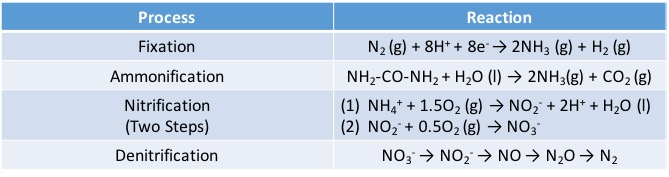
Processes that nitrogen undergo in estuarine systems

Nitrogen is often the lead cause of eutrophication in estuaries in temperate zones. During a eutrophication event, biogeochemical feedback decreases the amount of available silica. These feedbacks also increase the supply of nitrogen and phosphorus, creating conditions where harmful algal blooms can persist. Given the now off-balance nitrogen cycle, estuaries can be driven to phosphorus limitation instead of nitrogen limitation. Estuaries can be severely impacted by an unbalanced phosphorus cycle, as phosphorus interacts with nitrogen and silica availability.

With an abundance of nutrients in the ecosystem, plants and algae overgrow and eventually decompose, which produce a significant amount of carbon dioxide. While releasing CO_{2} into the water and atmosphere, these organisms are also intaking all or nearly all of the available oxygen creating a hypoxic environment and unbalanced oxygen cycle. The excess carbon in the form of CO_{2} can lead to low pH levels and ocean acidification, which is more harmful for vulnerable coastal regions like estuaries.

=== Effects of eutrophication on estuarine plants ===
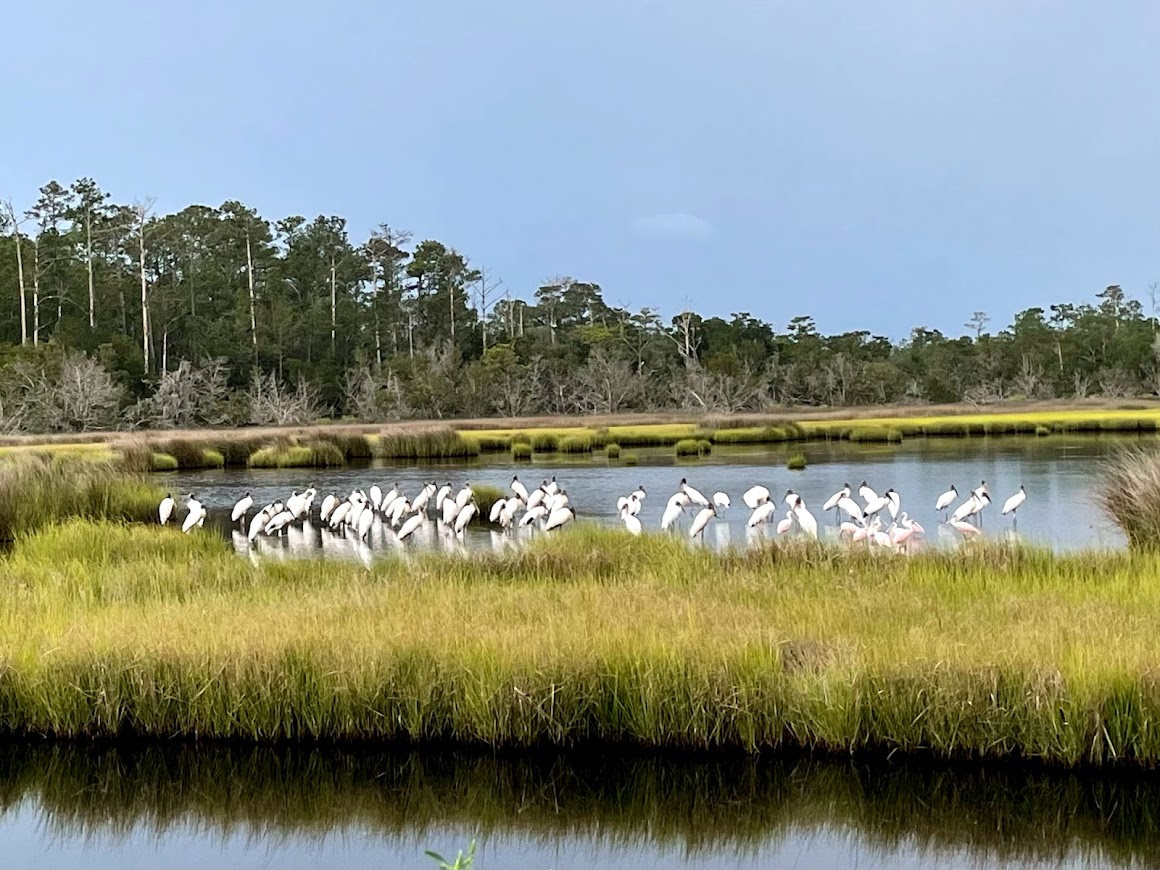
A salt marsh with wood storks wading

Eutrophication has been seen to negatively impact many plant communities in estuarine ecosystems. Salt marshes are a type of ecosystem in some estuaries that have been negatively impacted by eutrophication. Cordgrass vegetation dominates the salt marsh landscape. Excess nutrients allow the plants to grow at greater rates in above ground biomass, however less energy is allocated to the roots since nutrients is abundant. This leads to a lower biomass in the vegetation below ground which destabilizes the banks of the marsh causing increased rates of erosion. A similar phenomenon occurs in mangrove swamps, which are another potential ecosystem in estuaries. An increase in nitrogen causes an increase in shoot growth and a decrease in root growth. Weaker root systems cause a mangrove tree to be less resilient in seasons of drought, which can lead to the death of the mangrove. This shift in above ground and below ground biomass caused by eutrophication could hindered plant success in these ecosystems.

=== Effects of eutrophication on estuarine animals ===
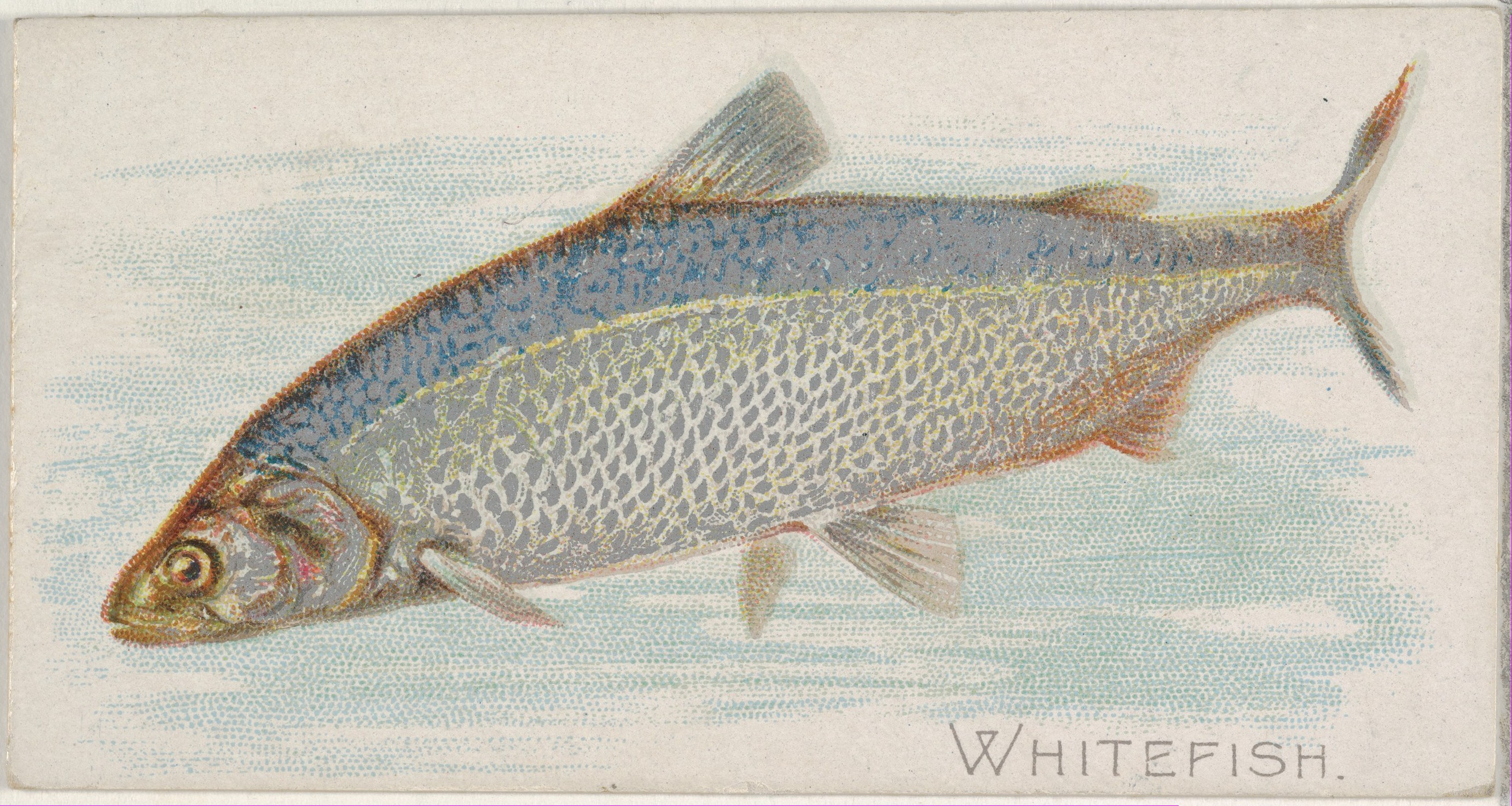
Example of a whitefish

Across all biomes, eutrophication often results in plant death but the impacts do not end there. Plant death alters the entire food web structure which can result in the death of animals within the afflicted biome. Estuaries are hotspots for biodiversity, containing a majority of commercial fish catch, making the impacts of eutrophication that much greater within estuaries. Some specific estuarine animals feel the effects of eutrophication more strongly than others. One example is the whitefish species from the European Alps. Eutrophication reduced the oxygen levels in their habitats so greatly that whitefish eggs could not survive, causing local extinctions. However, some animals, such as carnivorous fish, tend to do well in nutrient-enriched environments and can benefit from eutrophication. This can be seen in populations of bass or pikes.

=== Effects of eutrophication on human activities ===
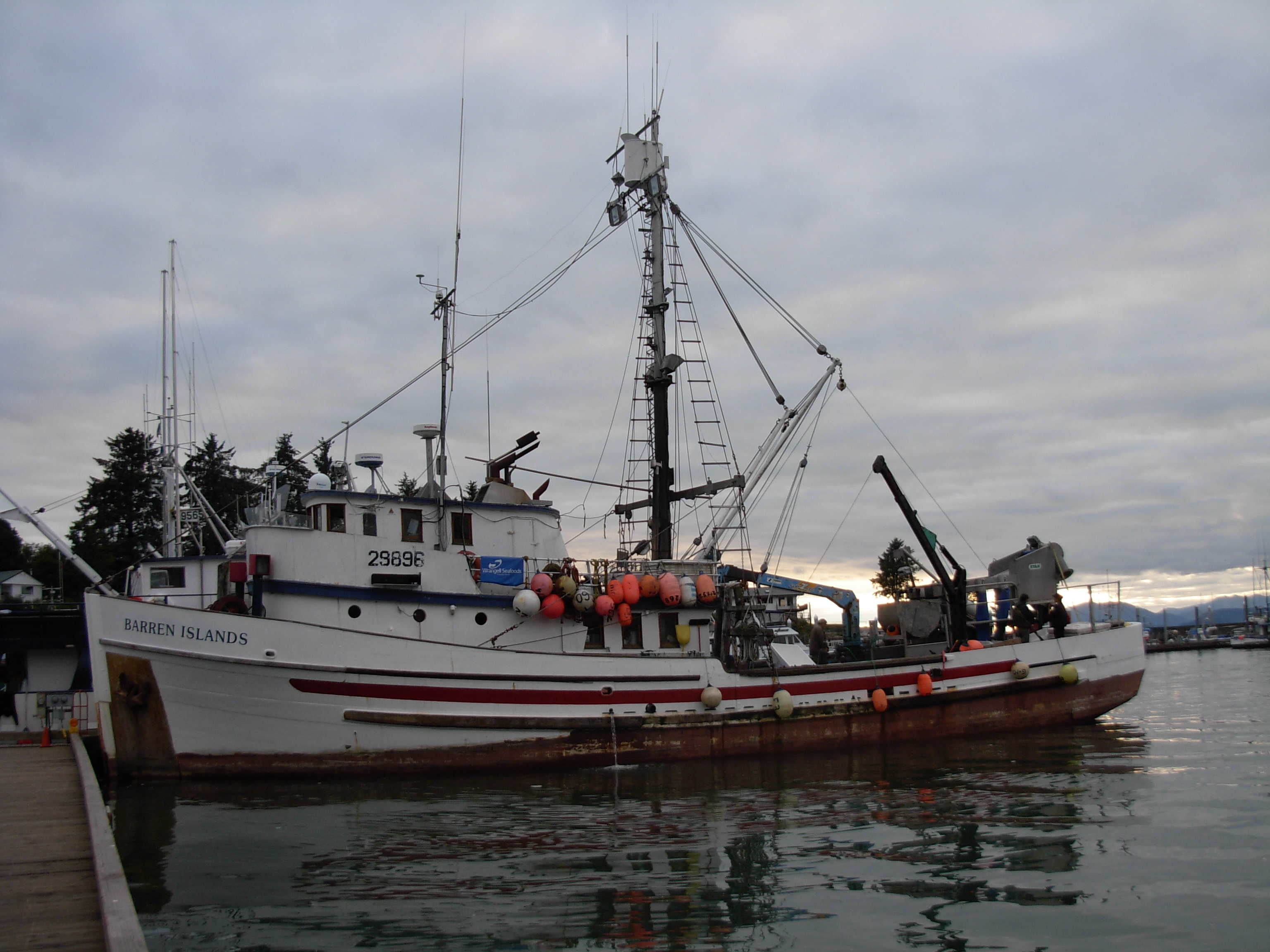
Commercial fishing boat

Eutrophication can affect many marine habitats which can lead to economic consequences. The commercial fishing industry relies upon estuaries for approximately 68 percent of their catch by value because of the great biodiversity of this ecosystem. During an algal bloom, fishermen have noticed a significant increase in the quantity of fish. A sudden increase in primary productivity causes spikes in fish populations which leads to more oxygen being utilized. It is the continued deoxygenation of the water that then causes a decline in fish populations. These effects can begin in estuaries and have a wide effect on the surrounding water bodies. In turn, this can decrease fishing industry sales in one area and across the country. Production in 2016 from recreational and commercial fishing contributes billions of dollars to the United States' gross domestic product (GDP). A decrease in production within this industry can affect any of the 1.7 million people the fishing industry employs yearly across the United States.

== Implications for marine life ==
Estuaries are incredibly dynamic systems, where temperature, salinity, turbidity, depth and flow all change daily in response to the tides. This dynamism makes estuaries highly productive habitats, but also make it difficult for many species to survive year-round. As a result, estuaries large and small experience strong seasonal variation in their fish communities. In winter, the fish community is dominated by hardy marine residents, and in summer a variety of marine and anadromous fishes move into and out of estuaries, capitalizing on their high productivity. Estuaries provide a critical habitat to a variety of species that rely on estuaries for life-cycle completion. Pacific Herring (Clupea pallasii) are known to lay their eggs in estuaries and bays, surfperch give birth in estuaries, juvenile flatfish and rockfish migrate to estuaries to rear, and anadromous salmonids and lampreys use estuaries as migration corridors. Also, migratory bird populations, such as the black-tailed godwit, rely on estuaries.

Two of the main challenges of estuarine life are the variability in salinity and sedimentation. Many species of fish and invertebrates have various methods to control or conform to the shifts in salt concentrations and are termed osmoconformers and osmoregulators. Many animals also burrow to avoid predation and to live in a more stable sedimental environment. However, large numbers of bacteria are found within the sediment which has a very high oxygen demand. This reduces the levels of oxygen within the sediment often resulting in partially anoxic conditions, which can be further exacerbated by limited water flow.

Phytoplankton are key primary producers in estuaries. They move with the water bodies and can be flushed in and out with the tides. Their productivity is largely dependent upon the turbidity of the water. The main phytoplankton present are diatoms and dinoflagellates which are abundant in the sediment.

A primary source of food for many organisms on estuaries, including bacteria, is detritus from the settlement of the sedimentation.

== Human impact ==
Of the thirty-two largest cities in the world in the early 1990s, twenty-two were located on estuaries.

As ecosystems, estuaries are under threat from human activities such as pollution and overfishing. They are also threatened by sewage, coastal settlement, land clearance and much more. Estuaries are affected by events far upstream, and concentrate materials such as pollutants and sediments. Land run-off and industrial, agricultural, and domestic waste enter rivers and are discharged into estuaries. Contaminants can be introduced which do not disintegrate rapidly in the marine environment, such as plastics, pesticides, furans, dioxins, phenols and heavy metals.

Such toxins can accumulate in the tissues of many species of aquatic life in a process called bioaccumulation. They also accumulate in benthic environments, such as estuaries and bay muds: a geological record of human activities of the last century. The elemental composition of biofilm reflect areas of the estuary impacted by human activities, and over time may shift the basic composition of the ecosystem, and the reversible or irreversible changes in the abiotic and biotic parts of the systems from the bottom up.

Estuaries tend to be naturally eutrophic because land runoff discharges nutrients into estuaries. With human activities, land run-off also now includes the many chemicals used as fertilizers in agriculture as well as waste from livestock and humans. Excess oxygen-depleting chemicals in the water can lead to hypoxia and the creation of dead zones. This can result in reductions in water quality, fish, and other animal populations. Overfishing also occurs. Chesapeake Bay once had a flourishing oyster population that has been almost wiped out by overfishing. Oysters filter these pollutants, and either eat them or shape them into small packets that are deposited on the bottom where they are harmless. Historically the oysters filtered the estuary's entire water volume of excess nutrients every three or four days. Today that process takes almost a year, and sediment, nutrients, and algae can cause problems in local waters.

Some major rivers that run through deserts historically had vast, expansive estuaries that have been reduced to a fraction of their former size, because of dams and diversions. One example is the Colorado River Delta in Mexico, historically covered with marshlands and forests, but now essentially a salt flat.

== Examples ==
=== Africa ===
Estuary	Countries
Congo River	Angola / Burundi / Cameroon / Central African Republic / Democratic Republic of the Congo / Gabon / Republic of the Congo / Rwanda / Tanzania / Zambia
Estuário do Espírito Santo	Mozambique
Gambia River	Gambia / Senegal
Gabon Estuary	Gabon
Geba River	Guinea / Guinea-Bissau / Senegal
Lake St Lucia	South Africa
Orange River	Lesotho / Namibia / South Africa
Pungwe River	Mozambique / Zimbabwe
Wouri River	Cameroon

=== Asia ===
Estuary	Countries
Amur River	China / Russia
Adyar River	India
Dawei River	Myanmar
Gulf of Ob	Russia
Hangzhou Bay	China
Hàn River	Vietnam
Kraburi River	Myanmar / Thailand
Meghna River	Bangladesh
Naf River	Bangladesh / Myanmar
Narmada river	India
Puerto Princesa Underground River	Philippines
Waeru River of Chanthaburi Province	Thailand
Yangtze River	China
Yenisei Gulf	Russia

=== Europe ===
Estuary	Countries
Dee Estuary	United Kingdom
Dnieper-Bug Estuary	Ukraine
Exe Estuary	United Kingdom
Firth of Clyde	United Kingdom
Firth of Forth	United Kingdom
Gironde estuary	France
Golden Horn	Turkey
Humber	United Kingdom
Oder	Czech Republic / Germany / Poland
Severn Estuary	United Kingdom
Shannon Estuary	Ireland
Solway Firth	United Kingdom
Southampton Water	United Kingdom
Tagus Estuary	Portugal
Thames Estuary	United Kingdom
The Wash	United Kingdom
Unterelbe	Germany
Western Scheldt	Netherlands

=== North America ===
Estuary	Countries
Albemarle Sound including Outer Banks of North Carolina	United States
Buzzards Bay	United States
Chesapeake Bay including Hampton Roads	United States
Columbia River Estuary	United States
Coos Bay	United States
Delaware Bay	United States
Drake's Estero	United States
East River
Estuary of Saint Lawrence	Canada
Fraser River	Canada
Galveston Bay	United States
Great Bay	United States
Indian River Lagoon	United States
Laguna de Términos	Mexico
Laguna Madre	United States
Lake Borgne	United States
Lake Merritt	United States
Long Island Sound	United States
Mackenzie River	Canada
Miramichi Bay	Canada
Mississippi River Delta	United States
Lake Pontchartrain	United States
Mobile Bay	United States
Narragansett Bay	United States
Newport Back Bay	United States
New York-New Jersey Harbor	United States
Pamlico Sound including the Outer Banks of North Carolina	United States
Puget Sound	United States
Billy Frank Jr. Nisqually National Wildlife Refuge on Puget Sound	United States
San Francisco Bay	United States
Sarasota Bay	United States
Tampa Bay	United States
Hudson River Estuary	United States

=== Oceania ===
Estuary	Countries
Avon Heathcote Estuary	New Zealand
Gippsland Lakes	Australia
Port Jackson	Australia
Spencer Gulf	Australia

=== South America ===
Estuary	Countries
Amazon River	Bolivia / Brazil / Colombia / Ecuador / Peru
Iguape-Cananéia-Paranaguá estuary lagoon complex	Brazil
Lagoa dos Patos and Lagoon Mirim	Brazil / Uruguay
Mearim River	Brazil
Rio de la Plata	Argentina / Uruguay

== See also ==
- Beaches in estuaries and bays – Type of beaches
- Coastal and Estuarine Research Federation – U.S. nonprofit organization
- Estuarine acidification – Reducing pH values in coastal marine ecosystems
- Estuarine fish – Fish that inhabit the sea between the shoreline and the edge of the continental shelf
- Firth – Scottish word used for various coastal inlets and straits
- Liman – Russian term for an estuary lagoon formed by a sandbar at a river's mouth
- List of estuaries of England
- List of estuaries of South Africa
- List of waterways
- National Estuarine Research Reserve – Network of 30 protected areas in the US
- Region of freshwater influence – Coastal sea region
- River delta – Silt deposition landform at the mouth of a river
- Shell growth in estuaries – Aspect of marine biology
- Tidal bore – Water wave traveling up a river or narrow bay because of an incoming tide
- Tidal prism – Volume of water in an estuary or inlet between mean high tide and mean low tide
- Wetland – Ecosystem that is flooded or saturated with water
