= Nonlinearity (disambiguation) =

Nonlinearity is a property of mathematical functions or data that cannot be graphed on straight lines, systems whose output(s) are not directly proportional to their input(s), objects that do not lie along straight lines, shapes that are not composed of straight lines, or events that are shown or told out-of-sequence.

Nonlinear or nonlinearity may also refer to:

== STEM ==
=== Journals ===
- Nonlinearity (journal), jointly published by IOP Publishing (Institute of Physics) and the London Mathematical Society
- Nonlinearity in Biology, Toxicology and Medicine, original title of Dose-Response, official journal of the International Dose-Response Society, published by SAGE

=== Mathematics ===
- Nonlinear conjugate gradient method, an algorithm for numerically finding the minimum of a nonlinear function
- Nonlinear programming (NLP; also known as nonlinear optimization), finding an optimal solution to a problem with non-linear constraints and/or a non-linear objective function
- Nonlinear realization, a kind of induced representation of a Lie group possessing a Cartan subgroup
- Nonlinear system, collection of interacting elements whose behavior is not expressible as a linear function of its inputs
- Non-linear transformation matrix, (n+1)×(n+1) array that can represent affine and projective operations on n-dimensional objects

==== Differential equations ====
Non-linear differential equation, equality statement, of more than just linear polynomials, involving functions and their derivatives

→ List of nonlinear ordinary differential equations (ordinary means there is only one independent variable)

Nonlinear partial differential equation, equality statement, of more than just linear polynomials, involving multivariable functions and their partial derivatives

→ List of nonlinear partial differential equations

- Nonlinear Fourier transform (AKA inverse scattering transform), a method that solves the initial value problem for a nonlinear partial differential equation (PDE) using methods related to wave scattering, analogous to how the inverse Fourier transform is used to solve linear PDEs

==== Nonlinear algebra ====
Nonlinear algebra, branch of mathematics generalizing linear algebra

- Nonlinear complementarity problem (NCP), finding a vector meeting certain conditions based on a given smooth mapping
- Nonlinear eigenproblem (AKA nonlinear eigenvalue problem), generalization of the eigenvalue problem that replaces M(λ) = A − λI
- Nonlinear functional analysis, the branch of mathematics that deals with nonlinear mappings

==== Statistics ====
Nonlinear modelling, representing a system in a way that accounts for at least some nonlinear effects

- Nonlinear autoregressive exogenous model (NARX), nonlinear function of past outputs and current & past inputs, that estimates the current output
- Nonlinear dimensionality reduction (NLDR; also known as manifold learning), non-linearly projecting high-dimensional data onto a lower-dimensional latent manifold
- Nonlinear expectation, functional, similar to expected value, but only needs to be monotonic and preserve constants
- Non-linear iterative partial least squares (NIPALS), an algorithm for computing the first few vectors for a principal component analysis (PCA)
- Non-linear least squares, a method to estimate parameters of a nonlinear model given a set of at least as many data points
- Nonlinear mixed-effects model, nonlinear function used to predict something
  - Non-linear mixed-effects modeling software (a list of programs that implement various estimation methods)
- Nonlinear regression, a method for finding a nonlinear function that approximates some data

=== Science ===
- Hyperpositive nonlinear effect, when some intermediate measurements exceed the final result of a generally increasing process, particularly of enantiopurity in asymmetric catalysis
- Linear-nonlinear-Poisson cascade model (LNP model), a description of neural spike response
- Non-linear effects in enantioselective synthesis (NLE), affecting enantiopurity of product of enantioselective synthesis
- Non-linear inverse problems, determining causal factors from a set of observations, when the forward map is a non-linear operator
- Non-linear preferential attachment, a model of the number of connections in a network
- Relative nonlinearity, a coexistence mechanism that maintains species diversity via differences in the response to and effect on variation in a factor mediating competition
- Wave nonlinearity, deviations from sinusoidal shape, particularly of surface gravity waves

==== Physics ====
- Nonlinear acoustics (NLA), the branch of physics about sound waves of sufficiently large amplitudes that linearization models them poorly
- Nonlinear force-free field (NLFFF), in plasma physics, magnetic flux density field with no Lorentz force and negligible plasma pressure, with nonzero current density (which must be parallel) and a force-free parameter/function α that depends on position
- Nonlinear frictiophoresis, the unidirectional drift of a particle caused by periodic driving force with zero mean, due to nonlinear dependence of the friction-drag force on its velocity
- Nonlinear memory effect, in astronomy, a kind of predicted persistent change in the relative position of pairs of masses in space due to the passing of a gravitational wave
- Non-linear phononics, the study of the behavior in solids of large amplitude oscillations of phonons, elementary vibrations of the crystal lattice
- Nonlinear resonance, accumulation of vibrations when external force does not coincide with the eigen-frequency of the system
- Nonlinear thin-shell instability (NTSI), a property of a thin-enough slab bounded by shocks on both sides, in the presence of a blast wave
- Nonlinear tides, non-sinusoidal tidal waves due to advection and friction
- Nonlinear X-wave (NLX), a kind of biconical-shaped multi-dimensional wave superposition that can travel without distortion

===== Electricity, magnetism, and optics =====
Nonlinear electrodynamics (NED, NLED), a family of generalizations of Maxwell electrodynamics in high-energy physics

Nonlinear optics, the field that examines the properties of light in matter when they depend on the light's intensity

- Kerr nonlinearity (the Kerr nonlinear optical effect; AKA the Kerr effect or the quadratic electro-optic (QEO) effect), a change in the refractive index of a material proportional to the square of an applied electric field
- Nonlinear dispersion relation in Vlasov–Poisson plasmas (NDR in ...), description of the frequency-dependent change in phase velocity for a nonlinear wave structure
- Non-linear inverse Compton scattering (NICS; also known as non-linear Compton scattering or multiphoton Compton scattering), the process of multiple low-energy photons interacting with a charged particle, absorbing some of its energy, changing its direction, and merging into a high-energy photon, in the presence of a very intense electromagnetic field
- Nonlinear-optical susceptibility, a measure of how strongly light interacts with matter
- Nonlinear photonic crystals, periodic structures whose optical response depends on the intensity of the optical field that propagates into the crystal
- Non linear piezoelectric effects in polar semiconductors, the manifestation that the strain-induced piezoelectric polarization depends on the strain tensor components multiplied by not just the first order but also higher-order piezoelectric coefficients
- Nonlinear susceptibility, nonlinear function for modelling how the resulting degree of polarization of a dielectric material starts to saturate at high values of an applied electric field
- Nonlinear theory of semiconductor lasers, the behavior of Fabry-Perot (FP) lasers resulting from gain, refractive index, and loss coefficient being functions of energy flux
- Organic nonlinear optical materials, a class of compounds with delocalized electrons at π–π* orbitals
- Wide field non linear microscopy, an ultrafast optical non-linear imaging technique in which a large area of the object is illuminated and imaged without the need for scanning

===== Particle physics and quantum mechanics =====
- Non-linear coherent states, a class of quasi-classical quantum entity
- Nonlinear Dirac equation, a model of self-interacting Dirac fermions
- Nonlinear Klein–Gordon equation, a relativistic wave equation of motion for spinless particles, with self-interactions introduced through a potential
- Nonlinear scalar field theory, a relativistically invariant classical theory of scalar fields, with a scalar potential added to the Lagrangian, implying a self-interaction
- Nonlinear Schrödinger equation (NLSE), a partial differential equation in both classical and quantum mechanics for modeling wave functions in certain situations
  - Normalized solutions (nonlinear Schrödinger equation)
- Non-linear sigma model, description of a field that takes on values in a nonlinear target manifold in quantum field theory

=== Engineering and technology ===
- Nonlinear control theory, the study of systems that are nonlinear and/or time-variant
- Nonlinear element, an electrical circuit component whose variables are not modelled with proportions
- Nonlinear-feedback shift register (NLFSR), something that generates a sequence of binary values where each is generated from the previous value by adding a bit computed from it to one end and removing a bit from the other end
- Nonlinear junction detector (NLJD), a device that illuminates a small region of space with high-frequency RF energy, then receives and analyzes the response, because things like p–n junctions will receive the energy and re-emit some of it at multiples of the illumination frequency, due to the asymmetric response of the junction to an electric field
- Nonlinear metamaterial, artificially constructed material that exhibits nonlinear electromagnetic (EM) behavior, such as because the microscopic electric field of the inclusions can be larger than the macroscopic electric field of the EM source, or due to the hysteresis-type dependence of its magnetic permeability on the magnetic component of the incident light propagating through it
- Non-linear networks, electronic circuits that cannot be modeled with linear superposition
- Non-Linear Systems, an electronics manufacturing company based in San Diego, California
- Nonlinear velocity obstacle (NLVO), a variation of the set of velocities predicted to result in collision with another robot

==== Signal processing ====
- Differential nonlinearity (DNL), the deviation between two analog values corresponding to adjacent input digital values
- Integral nonlinearity (INL), a measure of the deviation between the ideal output value (for a digital-to-analog converter) or the ideal input threshold value (for analog-to-digital), and the actual measured output value for a certain input code (DAC) or the measured threshold level of a certain output code (ADC)
- Nonlinear distortion, a non-linear relationship between input and output signals
- Nonlinear filter, device or process whose output is not a linear function of its input
- Non-linear multi-dimensional signal processing (NMSP)

== Arts and literature ==
- Non-Linear (album), 2004 debut studio album by South Korean indie rock band Mot
- Non-linear editing, modifying audio, video, and images by creating a list of editing steps with references to the source material, rather than storing the rendered result
- Nonlinear gameplay, the video game feature of giving players flexibility in the order in which they complete challenges
- Non-linear media, audiovisual media that can be interacted with by the viewer
- Nonlinear narrative, portrayal of events in a non-chronological manner
  - List of nonlinear narrative films
  - List of nonlinear narrative television series
- Nonlinears, advanced androids in the Inquest of Pilot Pirx

== Business ==
- Nonlinear management (NLM), leadership that allows order to emerge by allowing self-organization, evolution, and adaptation
- Nonlinear note-taking, recording information in a manner that does not directly follow the order in which it was presented
- Nonlinear pricing, a nonlinear relationship between price and quantity of goods
- Nonlinear workday, the pattern in which work is done during multiple separate time blocks

== Other uses ==
- Nonlinear warfare, the Russian conceptualization of hybrid combat wherein both military force and cyber/political/economic/psychological warfare are used
- Non-linear writing, visually-recorded representation of language with discontiguous markings

== See also ==
- Linear (disambiguation)
- Nonlinear medium (disambiguation)
- Curvilinear
