= Soai =

Soai may refer to:

- Kensō Soai (born 1950), Japanese organic chemist
  - Soai reaction, chemical reaction discovered by Kensō Soai
- Soai University, university in Osaka, Japan
- soái, Vietnamese-language word for:
  - General officer, in a military
  - General (xiangqi), type of board piece

== See also ==
- Soai-kai, yakuza organization based in Chiba Prefecture, Japan
- Soài Rạp, river in Vietnam
- Trần Văn Soái, Vietnamese warlord
