= Donna Blackmond =

American chemist

- Born: April 19, 1958; Pittsburgh, PA, United States
- Education: B.S. Chemical Engineering, University of Pittsburgh, 1980 M.S. Chemical Engineering, University of Pittsburgh, 1981 Ph.D. Chemical Engineering, Carnegie Mellon University, 1984
- Scientific career
- Fields: Chemical Engineering; Chemistry
- Workplaces: The Scripps Research Institute; Imperial College London; University of Hull; Max Planck Institute; University of Pittsburgh; University of Essen

Donna Blackmond FRS FREng (born April 19, 1958) is an American chemical engineer and the John C. Martin Endowed Chair in Chemistry at Scripps Research in La Jolla, California. Her research focuses on prebiotic chemistry, the origin of biological homochirality, and kinetics and mechanisms of asymmetric catalytic reactions. She is known for her development of Reaction Progress Kinetic Analysis (RPKA), analysis of non-linear effects of catalyst enantiopurity, biological homochirality, and amino acid behavior.

== Biography ==
Blackmond was born on April 19, 1958, in Pittsburgh, Pennsylvania. She attended the University of Pittsburgh and received her undergraduate and master's degrees in chemical engineering in 1980 and 1981 respectively. She received the Ph.D. in chemical engineering from Carnegie-Mellon University in 1984. She became a professor of chemical engineering at the University of Pittsburgh shortly after graduating and was promoted to associate professor with tenure in 1989. Blackmond remained in academia for 8 years before moving on to the associate director position at Merck & Co., Inc. Her main responsibility at the company was to set up a laboratory for research and development in the kinetics and catalysis of organic reactions. She was a research group leader at the Max-Planck-Institut für Kohlenforschung in Mülheim an-der-Ruhr, Germany, professor and chair of physical chemistry at the University of Hull in Kingston-upon-Hull, UK, and professor of chemistry and chemical engineering and chair in Catalysis at Imperial College London, UK. Blackmond is now a professor of chemistry, department chair, and the John C. Martin Endowed Chair in Chemistry at the Scripps Research Institute in La Jolla, California. Her most current research applies the quantitative aspects of her chemical engineering background to the synthesis of complex organic molecules by catalytic routes, particularly asymmetric catalysis.

== Areas of research ==
=== Reaction Progress Kinetic Analysis ===
Blackmond has pioneered the methodology of Reaction Progress Kinetic Analysis (RPKA), which is used for rapid determination of concentration dependences of reactants. RPKA allows for in situ measurements to produce a number of rate equations that enable analysis of a reaction using a minimal number of experiments. The purpose for this type of analysis is to help understand what the driving force of a reaction might be and describe possible mechanistic pathways. This technique distinguishes rate processes occurring on the catalytic cycle from those occurring off the cycle. Notable applications of RPKA include asymmetric hydrogenation, asymmetric organocatalytic reactions, palladium catalyzed carbon-carbon and carbon-nitrogen bond forming reactions, and transition-metal catalyzed competitive reactions.

=== Nonlinear effects of catalyst enantiopurity ===
Nonlinear effects describe the non-ideal relationship between enantiomeric excess (ee) of products of a reaction and the ee of the catalyst, a phenomenon first observed by Henri Kagan. Kagan developed mathematical models to describe this non-ideal behavior, ML_{n} models. Blackmond has performed studies that have led to an understanding of reaction rate and its relationship to catalyst ee. Many proposed mathematical models have been tested in the Blackmond lab, which have helped determine possible mechanistic features of reactions, including the Soai reaction. The Soai reaction is of abiotic synthetic interest because it is an autocatalytic reaction, which rapidly produces a large amount of enantiopure products. Blackmond was the first to use Kagan's ML_{2} model to study the non-linear effects of this reaction. She was the first to conclude that a homochiral dimer was the active catalyst in promoting homochirality for the Soai reaction.

=== Biological homochirality and amino acid phase behavior ===
More recently, Blackmond has extended kinetic models to describe the origin of biological homochirality. She has shown solutions of mostly enantiopure amino acids can be produced from nearly racemic mixtures via solution-solid partitioning of the enantiomers. The discovery that eutectic mixtures could be manipulated, depending on the components of the mixture, allows for changes to the crystal structure and solubility of substances. Amino acids crystallize in one of two ways, as a mixture of D and L enantiomers (racemic compound) or as separate enantiomers (conglomerate) . For nonracemic, nonenantiopure mixtures of molecules under ternary phase equilibrium, partitioning of enantiomers occurs between the liquid and solid phases depending on the form that the crystals take.

== Achievements and awards ==
- Centenary Prize for Chemistry and Communication (Royal Society of Chemistry),2025
- Fellow of the Royal Academy of Engineering,2025
- Fellow of the Royal Society, 2024
- James Flack Norris Award in Physical Organic Chemistry (American Chemical Society), 2023
- Elected Member, US National Academy of Sciences, 2021
- Oparin Medal, 2021
- Fellow of the Royal Society of Chemistry, 2021
- Elected Member, Deutsche Akademie der Naturforscher Leopoldina, 2020
- Elected Member, American Academy of Arts and Sciences, 2016
- American Institute of Chemists Chemical Pioneer Award, 2016
- Gabor Somorjai Award for Creative Research in Catalysis, American Chemical Society, 2016
- Elected Member, US National Academy of Engineering, 2013
- Royal Society of Chemistry Award in Physical Organic Chemistry, 2009
- Royal Society Wolfson Research Merit Award, 2007
- Arthur C. Cope Scholar Award, 2005
- Miller Institute Research Fellow at University of California, Berkeley, 2003
- The Royal Society of Chemistry's Award in Process Technology, 2003
- Organic Reactions Catalysis Society's Raul Rylander Award, 2003
- Woodward Visiting Scholar at Harvard University, 2002–2003
- North American Catalysis Society's Paul H. Emmett Award, 2001
- NSF Presidential Young Investigator Award, 1986–91
