= Non-linear effects in enantioselective synthesis =

Deviation from linearity in chemical synthesis

In enantioselective synthesis, a non-linear effect refers to a process in which the enantiopurity of the catalyst (or the chiral auxiliary) does not correlate linearly with the enantiopurity of the product produced. This deviation from linearity is described as the non-linear effect, NLE. The linearity can be expressed mathematically, as shown in Equation 1. Stereoselection (i.e. the ee_{product}) that is higher or lower than the enantiomeric excess of the catalyst (ee_{catalyst}, relative to the equation) is considered non-routine behavior.

$$ee_\text{product}=ee_{\max}ee_\text{catalyst}$$

For an ideal asymmetric reaction, the ee_{product} may be described as the product of ee_{max} multiplied by the ee_{catalyst}. This is not the case for reactions exhibiting NLE's.

In 1976, Wynberg and Feringa observed different chemical behavior in the reaction of an enantiopure and racemic substrate in a phenol coupling reaction. In 1986, Kagan and collaborators described the first non-linear effects in asymmetric catalysis and gave rational explanations for these phenomena. General definitions and mathematical models are essential for understanding nonlinear effects and their application to specific chemical reactions. In recent decades, the study of nonlinear effects has helped elucidate reaction mechanisms and guide synthetic applications.

== Types of non-linear effects ==
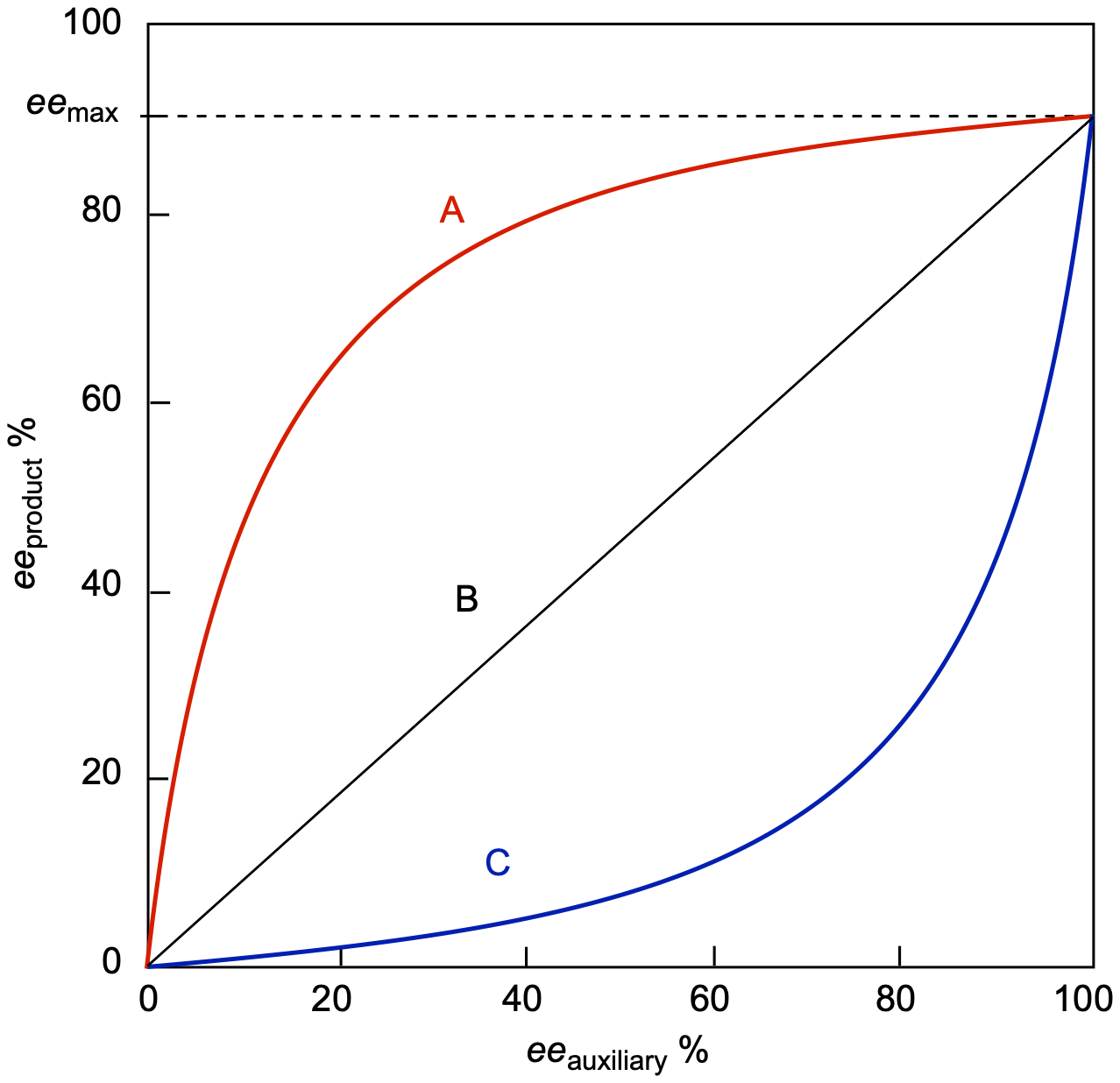
The relationship between the ee_{product} and the ee_{catalyst} in the (+)-NLE, linear, and (−)-NLE scenarios.

=== Positive non-linear effect, (+)-NLE ===
A positive non-linear effect, (+)-NLE, is present in an asymmetric reaction which demonstrates a higher product ee (ee_{product} ) than predicted by an ideal linear situation (Figure 1). It is often referred to as asymmetric amplification, a term coined by Oguni and co-workers. An example of a positive non-linear effect is observed in the case of Sharpless epoxidation with the substrate geraniol. In all cases of chemical reactivity exhibiting (+)-NLE, there is an innate tradeoff between overall reaction rate and enantioselectivity. The overall rate is slower and the enantioselectivity is higher relative to a linear behaving reaction.

=== Negative non-linear effect, (−)-NLE ===
Referred to as asymmetric depletion, a negative non-linear effect is present when the ee_{product} is lower than predicted by an ideal linear situation. In contrast to a (+)-NLE, a (−)-NLE results in a faster overall reaction rate and a decrease in enantioselectivity. Synthetically, a (−)-NLE effect could be beneficial with a reasonable assay for separating product enantiomers and a high output is necessary . An interesting example of a (−)-NLE effect has been reported in asymmetric sulfide oxidations.

=== Hyperpositive and enantiodivergent non-linear effect ===
Beyond the positive or negative non-linear effects, there are atypical cases which are briefly described in this section.

-A hyperpositive nonlinear effect refers to a case where the chiral catalyst, when not enantiopure, can be more enantioselective than its enantiopure counterpart. This case was first deduced from the theoretical models proposed by Henri Kagan in 1994 (i.e., ML_{3} model). The first experimental example of such non-linear effect was only observed in 2020 by S. Bellemin-Laponnaz, but with a mechanism that turns out to be different from Kagan's original proposal. The NLE arises due to the presence of active species across various aggregation levels.

-A catalytic system that generates either enantiomer of the product by modifying only the enantiomeric excess of the ligand (without changing the major enantiomer) is called an enantiodivergent non-linear effect. The first experimental example was described in 2002. The mechanism that could explain this type of behavior appears to be the same as for hyperpositive non-linear effects.

== Modeling non-linear effects ==
In 1986, Henri B. Kagan and coworkers observed a series of known reactions that followed a non-ideal behavior. A correction factor, f, was adapted to Equation 1 to fit the kinetic behavior of reactions with NLEs (Equation 2).

$$ee_\text{product}=f\,ee_{\max}ee_\text{catalyst}$$

Equation 2: A general mathematical equation that describes non-linear behavior

Unfortunately, Equation 2 is too general to apply to specific chemical reactions. Due to this, Kagan and coworkers also developed simplified mathematical models to describe the behavior of catalysts which lead to non-linear effects. These models involve generic ML_{n} species, based on a metal (M) bound to n number of enantiomeric ligands (L). The type of MLn model varies among asymmetric reactions, based on the goodness of fit with reaction data. With accurate modeling, NLE may elucidate mechanistic details of an enantioselective, catalytic reaction.

=== ML_{2} model ===
==== General description ====
The simplest model to describe a non-linear effect, the ML_{2} model involves a metal system (M) with two chiral ligands, L_{R} and L_{S}. In addition to the catalyzed reaction of interest, the model accounts for a steady state equilibrium between the unbound and bound catalyst complexes. There are three possible catalytic complexes at equilibrium (ML_{S}L_{R}, ML_{S}L_{S}, ML_{R}L_{R}). The two enantiomerically pure complexes ( ML_{S}L_{S}, ML_{R}L_{R}) are referred to as homochiral complexes. The possible heterochiral complex, ML_{R}L_{S}, is often referred to as a meso-complex.

$$\begin{align}
& \begin{matrix}
\mathrm{M}+\mathrm{L}_R+\mathrm{L}_S\quad\rightleftharpoons\quad & \mathrm{ML}_R\mathrm{L}_R & + & \mathrm{ML}_S\mathrm{L}_S & + & \mathrm{ML}_R\mathrm{L}_S & \\
& x & & y & & z & \left\}\quad\overset{}{\text{concentrations}}\right. \\
& \\
& \left\downarrow \begin{matrix} \\ \mathrm{r}_{RR} \\ \\ \end{matrix} \right. && \left\downarrow \begin{matrix} \\ \mathrm{r}_{SS} \\ \\ \end{matrix} \right. && \left\downarrow \begin{matrix} \\ \mathrm{r}_{RS} \\ \\ \end{matrix} \right. & \left\}\quad\overset{}{\text{rates}}\right.\qquad\qquad \\
\end{matrix} \\
\\
& \qquad\qquad\qquad\qquad\qquad\qquad\;\;\;\;\;\text{reaction products} \\
& \qquad\qquad\qquad\qquad\qquad\qquad\qquad\;\;\;\;\;\text{ee}_\text{product} \\
\\
& \text{Equilibrium constant: }K=\frac{z^2}{xy}
\end{align}$$
The basic scheme of an ML_{2} model developed by H. B. Kagan

The equilibrium constant that describes this equilibrium, K, is presumably independent on the catalytic chemical reaction. In Kagan's model, K is determined by the amount of aggregation present in the chemical environment. A K=4 is considered to be the state at which there is a statistical distribution of ligands to each metal complex. In other words, there is no thermodynamic disadvantage or advantage to the formation of heterochiral complexes at K=4.

Obeying the same kinetic rate law, each of the three catalytic complexes catalyze the desired reaction to form product. As enantiomers of each other, the homochiral complexes catalyze the reaction at the same rate, although opposite absolute configuration of the product is induced (i.e. r_{RR}=r_{SS}). The heterochiral complex, however, forms a racemic product at a different rate constant (i.e. r_{RS}).

==== Mathematical model for the ML_{2} Model ====
In order to describe the ML_{2} model in quantitative parameters, Kagan and coworkers described the following formula:

$$ee_\text{product}=ee_\text{max} ee_\text{auxiliary} (1+\beta)/(1+g\,\beta)$$

In the correction factor, Kagan and co-workers introduced two new parameters absent in Equation 1, β and g. In general, these parameters represent the concentration and activity of three catalytic complexes relative to each other. β represents the relative amount of the heterochiral complex (ML_{R}L_{S}) as shown in Equation 3. It is important to recognize that the equilibrium constant K is independent on both β and g. As described by Donna Blackmond at Scripps Research Institute, "the parameter K is an inherent property of the catalyst mixture, independent of the ee_{catalyst}. K is also independent of the catalytic reaction itself, and therefore independent of the parameter g."

$$\beta=z/(x+y)$$

Equation 3: The correction factor, β, may be described as z, the heterochiral complex concentration, divided by x and y, the respective concentrations of the complex concentration divided by x and y, the respective concentrations of the homochiral complexes

The parameter g represents the reactivity of the heterochiral complex relative to the homochiral complexes. As shown in Equation 5, this may be described in terms of rate constants. Since the homochiral complexes react at identical rates, g can then be described as the rate constant corresponding to the heterochiral complex divided by the rate constant corresponding to either homochiral complex.

$$g=r_{rs}/r_{rr}$$

Equation 4: The correction parameter, g, can be described as the rate of product formation with the heterochiral catalyst ML_{R}L_{S} divided by the rate of product formation of the homochiral complex (ML_{R}L_{R} or ML_{S}L_{S}).

==== Interpretation of the mathematical results of the ML_{2} Model ====
- If β=0 or g=1, the ML_{2} equation simplifies to the Equation 1. No meso catalyst complex is present or active. Therefore, the simple additive properties should apply to such a scenario to establish a linear relationship between product enantioselectivity and the enantiopurity of the chiral catalyst.

- If the correction factor is greater than one, the reaction displays an asymmetric amplification, also known as a positive non-linear effect. Under the ML_{2} model, a (+)-NLE infers a less reactive heterochiral catalyst. In this case, the equilibrium constant K also increases as the correction factor increases. Although the product enantioselectivity is relatively high compared to the enantiopurity of the chiral catalyst, this comes at a cost of the overall reaction rate. In order to achieve an asymmetric amplification, there must be a relatively large concentration of the heterochiral complex. In addition, this heterochiral complex must have a substantially slower rate of reactivity, r_{RS}. Therefore, the reactive catalytic species should decrease in concentration, leading to an overall slower reaction rate.

- If the correction factor is less than one, the reaction displays an asymmetric depletion, also known as a negative non-linear effect. In this scenario, the heterochiral catalyst is relatively more reactive than the homochiral catalyst complexes. In this case, the (−)-NLE may result in an overall faster although less selective product formation.

iv. Reaction Kinetics with the ML_{2} Model: Following H.B. Kagan's publication of the ML_{2} model, Professor Donna Blackmond at Scripps demonstrated how this model could be used to also calculate the overall reaction rates. With these relative reaction rates, Blackmond showed how the ML_{2} model could be used to formulate kinetic predictions which could then be compared to experimental data. The overall rate equation, Equation 6, is shown below.

$$r=(x+y+gz)r_{RR}$$

In addition to the goodness of fit to the model, kinetic information about the overall reaction may further validate the proposed reaction mechanism. For instance, a positive NLE in the ML_{2} should result in an overall lower reaction rate. By solving the reaction rate from Equation 6, one can confirm if that is the case.

=== M*L_{2} Model ===
==== General description ====
Similar to the ML_{2} model, this modified system involves chiral ligands binding to a metal center (M) to create a new center of chirality. There are four pairs of enantiomeric chiral complexes in the M*L_{2} model, as shown in Figure 5.

$$\begin{matrix}
\begin{matrix}\mathrm{M}+\mathrm{L}_R+\mathrm{L}_S\quad\rightleftharpoons\rightleftharpoons\quad \\ \\ \\ \\ \\ & \end{matrix}
\begin{align}
& \begin{matrix}
\mathrm{M}_R\mathrm{L}_R\mathrm{L}_R & + & \mathrm{M}_R\mathrm{L}_R\mathrm{L}_S & + & \mathrm{M}_R\mathrm{L}_S\mathrm{L}_R & + & \mathrm{M}_R\mathrm{L}_S\mathrm{L}_S \\
\mathrm{M}_S\mathrm{L}_S\mathrm{L}_S & + & \mathrm{M}_S\mathrm{L}_S\mathrm{L}_R & + & \mathrm{M}_S\mathrm{L}_R\mathrm{L}_S & + & \mathrm{M}_S\mathrm{L}_R\mathrm{L}_R \\
& \\
\left\downarrow \begin{matrix} k_0 \\ \pm EE_0 \end{matrix} \right. && \left\downarrow \begin{matrix} k_1 \\ \pm EE_1 \end{matrix}\right. && \left\downarrow \begin{matrix} k_2 \\ \pm EE_2 \end{matrix}\right. && \left\downarrow \begin{matrix} k_3 \\ \pm EE_3 \end{matrix}\right.
\end{matrix} \\
\\
& \qquad\qquad\qquad\qquad\qquad\,\,\,\,\text{products}
\end{align}
\end{matrix}$$
Figure 5: The equilibrium present in the M*L_{2}. This is very similar to the ML_{2} model. However, due to the new center of chirality, there are four sets of enantiomers.

In this model, one can make the approximation that the dimeric complexes dissociate irreversibly to the monomeric species. In this case, the same mathematical equations apply to the ML*_{2} model that applied to the ML_{2} model.

=== ML_{3} model ===
==== General description ====
A higher level of modeling, the ML_{3} model involves four active catalytic complexes: ML_{R}L_{R}L_{R}, ML_{S}L_{S}L_{S}, ML_{R}L_{R}L_{S}, ML_{S}L_{S}L_{R}. Unlike the ML_{2} model, where only the two homochiral complexes reacted to form enantiomerically enriched product, all four of the catalytic complexes react enantioselectively. However, the same steady state assumption applies to the equilibrium between unbound and bound catalytic complexes as in the more simple ML_{2} model. This relationship is shown below in Figure 7.

$\ce{{M} + {L_R} + L_S <=>}\ \underbrace\ce{ML_R L_R L_R}_x + \underbrace\ce{ML_S L_S L_S}_y + \underbrace\ce{ML_R L_R L_S}_z + \underbrace\ce{ML_S L_S L_R}_w$
Figure 7: The equilibrium between the unbound species and the reactive catalytic species in the ML_{3} model.

==== Mathematical modeling ====
Calculating the ee_{product} is considerably more challenging than in the simple ML_{2} model. Each of the two heterochiral catalytic complexes should react at the same rate. The homochiral catalytic complexes, similar to the ML_{2} case, should also react at the same rate. As such, the correction parameter g is still calculated as the rate of the heterochiral catalytic complex divided by the rate of the homochiral catalytic complex. However, since the heterochiral complexes lead to enantiomerically enriched product, the overall equation for calculating the ee_{product} becomes more difficult. In Figure 8., the mathematical formula for calculating enantioselectivity is shown.

$$EE_\text{prod}=EE_0 ee_\text{aux}\frac{3+3\,g\,EE'_0/EE_0+(1-3\,g\,EE'_0/EE_0)ee_\text{aux}^2}{1+3\,g+3(1-g)ee_\text{aux}^2}$$

Figure 8: The mathematical formula describing an ML_{3} system. The ee_{product} is calculated by multiplying the ee_{max} by the correction factor developed by Kagan and co-workers.

==== Interpretation of the ML_{3} Model ====
In general, interpreting the correction parameter values of g to predict positive and negative non-linear effects is considerably more difficult. In the case where the heterochiral complexes ML_{R}L_{R}L_{S} and ML_{S}L_{S}L_{R} are less reactive than the homochiral complexes ML_{S}L_{S}L_{S} and ML_{R}L_{R}L_{R}, a kinetic behavior similar to the ML_{2} model is observed (Figure 9). However, a substantially different behavior is observed in the case where the heterochiral complexes are more reactive than the homochiral complexes. In such case, Kagan and collaborators showed that it is possible to have a case “where the enantiomeric excess could take on much larger values for a partially resolved ligand than for an enantiomerically pure ligand”. The authors proposed the term “hyperpositive nonlinear effect” to characterize this situation.

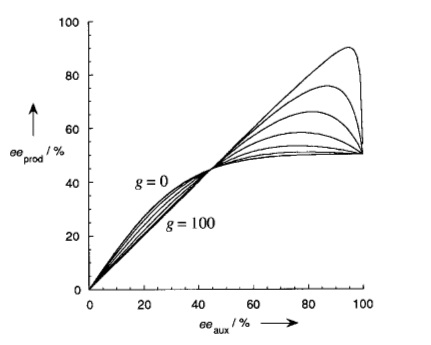
Figure 9: When the heterochiral complexes are more selective and reactive than the homochiral complexes.

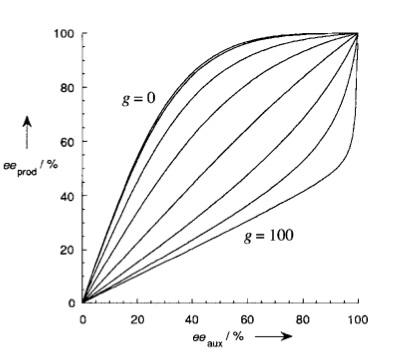
Figure 10: When the homochiral complexes are more selective and reactive than the heterochiral complexes.

=== Reservoir Effect ===
==== General Description ====
Often described adjacent or in collaboration with the ML_{2} model, the reservoir effect describes the scenario in which part of the chiral ligand is allocated to a pool of inactive heterochiral catalytic complexes outside the catalytic cycle. A pool of unreactive heterochiral catalysts, described with an ee_{pool}, develops an equilibrium with the catalytically active homochiral complexes, described with an ee_{effective}. Depending on the concentration of the inactive pool of catalysts, one can calculate the enantiopurity of the active catalyst complexes. The general result of the reservoir effect is an asymmetric amplification, also known as a (+)-NLE.

==== Origin of the Reservoir Effect ====
The pool of unreactive catalytic complexes, as described in the reservoir effect, can be the result of several factors. One of these could potentially be an aggregation effect amongst the heterochiral catalytic complexes that takes place prior to the steady state equilibrium.

== Early Examples of the Non-Linear Effect ==
=== Sharpless Epoxidation of Geraniol ===
In 1986, Kagan and co-workers were able to demonstrate NLE with the Sharpless epoxidation of (E)-Geraniol (Figure 11). Under Sharpless oxidizing conditions with Ti(O-i-Pr)_{4}/(+)-DET/t-BuOOH, Kagan and coworkers were able to demonstrate that there was a non-linear correlation between the ee_{product} and the ee of the chiral catalyst, diethyl tartrate (DET). As one can see from Figure 11, a greater ee_{product} than expected was observed. According to the ML_{2} model, Kagan and coworkers were able to conclude that a less reactive heterochiral DET complex was present. This would therefore explain the asymmetric amplification observed. The NLE data is also consistent with the Sharpless mechanism of asymmetric epoxidation.

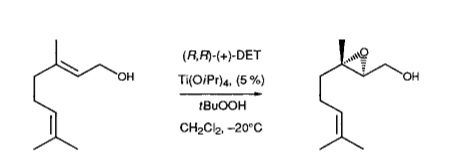
Figure 11: The general reaction scheme studied by Kagan and coworkers for the Sharpless epoxidation of geraniol.

=== Asymmetric Sulfide Oxidation ===
In 1994, Kagan and co-workers reported a NLE in asymmetric sulfide oxidation. The goodness of fit for the reaction data matched the ML_{4} model. This implied that a dimeric Titanium complexed with 4 DET ligands was the active catalytic species. In this case, the reaction rate would be significantly faster relative to ideal reaction kinetics. The downfall, as is the case in all (−)-NLE scenarios, is that the enantioselectivity was lower than expected. Below, in Figure 12, one can see the concavity of the data points is highly indicative of a (−)-NLE.

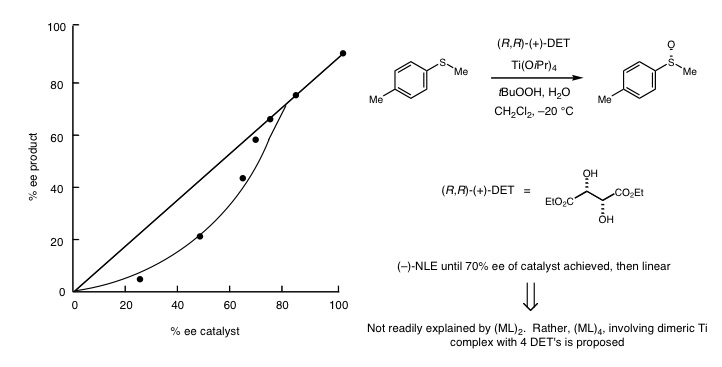
Figure 12: A clear indication of a negative non-linear effect in the asymmetric sulfide oxidation reaction.

== Prebiotic Catalysis and the Non-linear Effect ==
In pre-biotic chemistry, autocatalytic systems play a significant rule in understanding the origin of chirality in life. An autocatalytic reaction, a reaction in which the product acts as a catalyst for itself, serves as a model for homochirality. The asymmetric Soai reaction is commonly referred to as chemical plausibility for this pre-biotic hypothesis. In this system, an asymmetric amplification is observed during the process of autocatalytic catalysis. Professor Donna Blackmond has studied the NLE of this reaction extensively using Kagan's ML_{2} model. From this mathematical analysis, Blackmond was able to conclude that a dimeric, homochiral complex was the active catalyst in promoting homochirality for the Soai reaction.
