= Sonya Legg =

British oceanographer

Sonya Allayne Legg
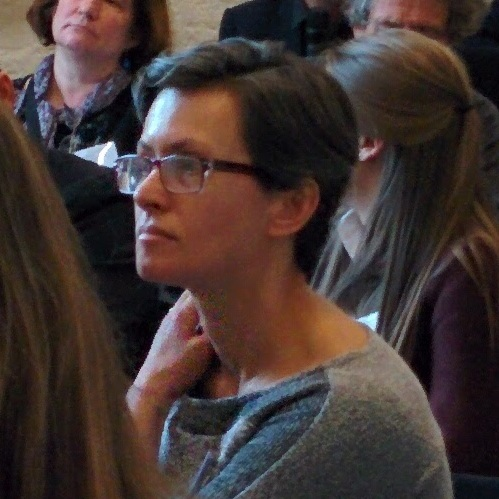
- in 2016
- Education: University of Oxford; Imperial College London
- Scientific career
- Workplaces: Woods Hole Oceanographic Institution; University of California, Los Angeles; Princeton University
- Thesis: Open ocean deep convection : the spreading phase. (1993)

Sonya Legg is a British oceanographer who is Director of the Center for Ocean Leadership. She studies the physical and dynamical processes of ocean circulation. Legg is involved with various initiatives to improve the representation of women in geoscience. She was Chair of the Mentoring Physical Oceanography Women to Increase Retention (MPOWIR) and is the co-chair of the Scientific Steering Group that directs the work of CLIVAR.

== Early life and education ==
Legg was born to a British father and a Sri Lankan mother and she was brought up far from an ocean in Zambia. She became interested in weather and climate as a child, and by the age of nine had her own weather station thermometers. She was a student at Wells Cathedral School and at the University of Oxford, where she studied physics and graduated with first class honours. She moved to London for her graduate research, and specialised in physical oceanography at Imperial College London. She was a postdoctoral fellow at the University of Colorado Boulder, where she worked in JILA. After two years in Boulder, Legg moved to the University of California, Los Angeles.

== Research and career ==
In 1997, Legg joined Woods Hole Oceanographic Institution. She was promoted to Associate Scientist in 2001, and awarded tenure in 2005. She moved to Princeton University in 2004. She was promoted to associate director of the Cooperative Institute for Climate Science in 2013. In 2023, Legg left Princeton to become the first permanent director of the Center for Ocean Leadership.

Legg studies the dynamics of ocean circulation, primarily using numerical and theoretical approaches. She has investigated the processes that underpin ocean mixing, including the breaking of internal waves, deep convection and gravity currents. In 2015 she was one of the co-authors of an article published in Nature that looked at the internal waves in the South China Sea. The paper reported the existence of >0.2 km high breaking internal waves. She is the chair of the Scientific Steering Group which directs the work of CLIVAR.

== Academic service ==
Legg has sought to improve equality and diversity in the earth sciences. From 2014 to 2022, she was Chair of MPOWIR (Mentoring Physical Oceanography Women to Increase Retention), a United States-based initiative to mentor early career women in geosciences. She is a member of the Society for the Advancement of Chicanos/Hispanics and Native Americans in Science, the Princeton Women in Geosciences and the Earth Science Women's Network (ESWN).

== Selected publications ==
- Matthew H Alford; Thomas Peacock; Jennifer A MacKinnon; et al. (1 May 2015). "The formation and fate of internal waves in the South China Sea". Nature. 521 (7550): 65–69. Bibcode:2015Natur.521...65A. doi:10.1038/nature14399. ISSN 1476-4687. PMID 25951285. Wikidata Q40965099. (erratum)
- Sonya Legg; Bruce Briegleb; Yeon Chang; et al. (May 2009). "Improving Oceanic Overflow Representation in Climate Models: The Gravity Current Entrainment Climate Process Team". Bulletin of the American Meteorological Society. 90 (5): 657–670. doi:10.1175/2008bams2667.1. ISSN 0003-0007. Wikidata Q58386374.
- Sonya Legg; Alistair Adcroft (November 2003). "Internal Wave Breaking at Concave and Convex Continental Slopes". Journal of Physical Oceanography. 33 (11): 2224–2246. Bibcode:2003JPO....33.2224L. doi:10.1175/1520-0485(2003)033<2224:iwbaca>2.0.co;2. ISSN 0022-3670. Wikidata Q58891791.
