= Non-Linear (album) =

Studio album by Mot
- Released: June 18, 2004
- Genre: Indie rock, trip hop
- Length: 54:30
- Label: Bounce
- Producer: Mot

Mot chronology
Non-Linear (2004)	Strange Season (2007)

Non-Linear (Korean: 비선형; RR: Biseonhyeong) is the debut studio album by South Korean indie rock band Mot. The album was released on 18 June 2004. Through the album, the band won the Rookie of the Year at the 2005 Korean Music Awards.

== Background ==
Mot is a band that began in 1996 with Eaeon's solo project, and the band were converted into a duo form in 2001 when he met Z.EE on the Internet. They did not have any concerts and live performances before the first album production period, which continued until their second album Strange Season was released.

== Critical reception ==
Professional ratings
Review scores
Source	Rating
Weiv	8/10

Eom Jaedeok of IZM described this album as an album that uses a fairly neat sound, reflecting their intention to pursue sophisticated music rather than vague gloom. Shim Jaegyeom of Music Y praised the emotion of the memory of despair and loss that penetrated the album, and he described the band as "Mot represents their gloomy sentiment by fusing the style of jazz and the sound of modern rock based on breakbeat and trip hop." Jang Yook of Weiv described the album as "depressing but hopeful nonlinear turbulence." The album ranked 59th on the top 100 Korean albums led by Kyunghyang Shinmun, and music critic Kim Yoonha reviewed the album as a piece of work in which self-study, resignation, obsession, sadness caused by loss, and sneering are combined into a lump, and are overflowing as if eating our ears in a nonlinear melody.

== Track listing ==
No.	Title	Length
1.	"Cold Blood"	3:39
2.	"What a Wonderful World"	3:45
3.	"Caffeine" ("카페인")	4:48
4.	"I Am"	3:48
5.	"Love Song"	4:00
6.	"Vertigo" ("현기증")	5:41
7.	"Song of the Highest Tower" ("가장 높은 탑의 노래")	3:22
8.	"But the Uncertainty is More and More" ("그러나 불확실성은 더욱 더")	2:15
9.	"I'm Proud" ("자랑")	4:34
10.	"Lost" ("상실")	4:28
11.	"To You Who Desire My Despair" ("나의 절망을 바라는 당신에게")	3:35
12.	"Wings" ("날개")	5:35
13.	"Mixolydian Weather"	5:00
