= Guilt-Free =

Studio album by Eaeon
- Released: February 2, 2012
- Genre: Glitch pop, Electronica, indie rock
- Length: 37:16
- Language: Korean, English
- Label: Elephant Music, Sony Music Korea
- Producer: Eaeon

Eaeon chronology
Guilt-Free (2012)	Fragile (2021)

Guilt-Free is the debut studio album by South Korean singer-songwriter Eaeon. The album was released on 2 February 2012.

== Background ==
Unlike the music he released through the band Mot, Eaeon focused on electronic sound on his first solo studio album. He interviewed about the album as "The album was focused on creating sophisticated and unusual sounds"

== Critical reception ==
Professional ratings
Review scores
Source	Rating
IZM	4/5 stars

Kim Banya of IZM reviewed "Unlike Mot's music, which came to surrealism, his solo album Guilt-Free is similar to a still life that is super close to the truth, without meaning and annotation." Choi Seongwook of Weiv described the track Window Car Apple Hat (창문 자동차 사과 모자) as "With the addition of a few keys, contra-base sounds, and a drum machine, the minimal composition is repeated, and this cold and simple sound pattern continues to capture the mind." The selection committee of the 2013 Korean Music Awards reviewed the album as "Although it does not have the heat of the blacksmith's shop, the deep emotions of the crafts are unique", and the album was nominated for the Best Dance & Electronic Album.

== Track listing ==
No.	Title	Length
1.	"Bulletproof"	3:37
2.	"And You Are Asleep" ("너는 자고")	3:46
3.	"SCLC (Sugar Caffeine Liquid Cloud)"	3:45
4.	"The World's Gonna End" ("세상이 끝나려고해")	3:59
5.	"Drug"	3:52
6.	"Anniversary for Me" ("나의 기념일")	3:44
7.	"Window Car Apple Hat" ("창문 자동차 사과 모자")	4:52
8.	"5 In 4"	3:28
9.	"Sad Mannequin" ("슬픈 마네킹")	3:44
10.	"Nobody Knows What Happened" ("무슨 일이 일어났는지는 아무도")	2:29
