= Kensō Soai =

Japanese organic chemist (born 1950)

- 硤合 憲三
- Born: 3 May 1950 (age 76); Fuchū, Hiroshima, Japan
- Education: University of Tokyo (PhD)
- Awards: Ryoji Noyori Prize (2023); Japan Academy Prize (2025); Nobel Prize in Chemistry (2026)
- Scientific career
- Fields: Organic chemistry; Asymmetric catalysis
- Workplaces: Tokyo University of Science
- Doctoral advisor: Teruaki Mukaiyama

Kensō Soai (硤合 憲三, Soai Kensō; born 3 May 1950) is a Japanese organic chemist, Professor Emeritus in the Department of Applied Chemistry at Tokyo University of Science.

In 2026, he was jointly awarded the Nobel Prize in Chemistry with Henri B. Kagan "for the discovery of non-linear effects and autocatalysis in asymmetric organic synthesis."

== Biography ==
Soai studied at the University of Tokyo, where he received his Ph.D. in 1979 in organic synthesis under Teruaki Mukaiyama and was a fellow of the Japan Society for the Promotion of Science. He conducted his postdoctoral studies with Ernest L. Eliel at the University of North Carolina. In 1981, he became a lecturer at Tokyo University of Science, and was promoted to associate professor (1986) and full professor (1991). In 2026, he was jointly awarded the Nobel Prize in Chemistry with Henri B. Kagan "for the discovery of non-linear effects and autocatalysis in asymmetric organic synthesis."

He is involved in asymmetric and enantioselective synthesis, asymmetric autocatalysis, and the origin of chirality. In 1995, Soai discovered a reaction with the chiral compound 5-pyrimidyl alkanol that produced almost exclusively one of the two mirror-image forms of a molecule as a product, mimicking a process found in living organisms. In 2003, he was able to demonstrate this reaction with nonchiral reactants. Specifically, the Soai reaction for alkylation of pyrimidine-5-carbaldehyde with diisopropylzinc is named after him. In this reaction, both reactants, which are non-chiral, produce the chiral product pyrimidyl alcohol, which further induces that same chirality in subsequent catalytic cycles.

Soai was a visiting professor at several universities such as the ESPCI Paris (2001), Kyushu University (2005), Waseda University (2007–2010), University of Strasbourg (2008), and Jilin University (2010–2015). He retired as a professor in 2016.

== Honors and awards ==
- Inoue Prize (2000)
- Chirality Medal (2005)
- Honorary member of the Italian National Academy of Sciences (2006)
- Science and Technology Prize from MEXT, the Japanese Ministry of Education, Culture, Sports, Science and Technology (2007)
- Chemical Society of Japan Award (2010)
- Purple Ribbon Medal (2012)
- Doctor Honoris Causa, University of Pannonia, Hungary (2015)
- Third Class of the Order of the Sacred Treasure (2023)
- Ryoji Noyori Prize (2023)
- Japan Academy Prize (2025)
- Nobel Prize in Chemistry (2026)
- Order of Culture (2026)

In its 2026 Nobel announcement, the Royal Swedish Academy of Sciences highlighted Soai's progression from his 1995 work on asymmetric autocatalysis to a 2003 reaction producing one of two possible mirror-image forms. It placed these results in the study of homochirality and the design of pharmaceutical synthesis. The prize money was shared equally with Henri B. Kagan.

== Selected publications ==
- Mukaiyama, Teruaki; Soai, Kenso; Sato, Toshio; Shimizu, Hisashi; Suzuki, Keisuke (1979). "Enantioface-differentiating (asymmetric) addition of alkyllithium and dialkylmagnesium to aldehydes by using (2S,2'S)-2-hydroxymethyl-1-[(1-alkylpyrrolidin-2-yl)methyl]pyrrolidines as chiral ligands". Journal of the American Chemical Society. 101 (6). American Chemical Society (ACS): 1455–1460. Bibcode:1979JAChS.101.1455M. doi:10.1021/ja00500a015. ISSN 0002-7863.
- Soai, Kenso; Shibata, Takanori; Morioka, Hiroshi; Choji, Kaori (1995). "Asymmetric autocatalysis and amplification of enantiomeric excess of a chiral molecule". Nature. 378 (6559): 767–768. Bibcode:1995Natur.378..767S. doi:10.1038/378767a0. ISSN 0028-0836.
- Sato, Itaru; Urabe, Hiroki; Ishiguro, Saori; Shibata, Takanori; Soai, Kenso (20 January 2003). "Amplification of Chirality from Extremely Low to Greater than 99.5 % ee by Asymmetric Autocatalysis". Angewandte Chemie International Edition. 42 (3): 315–317. Bibcode:2003ACIE...42..315S. doi:10.1002/anie.200390105. ISSN 1433-7851. PMID 12548688.
