= Internal wave breaking =

Fluid dynamics process driving mixing in the oceans

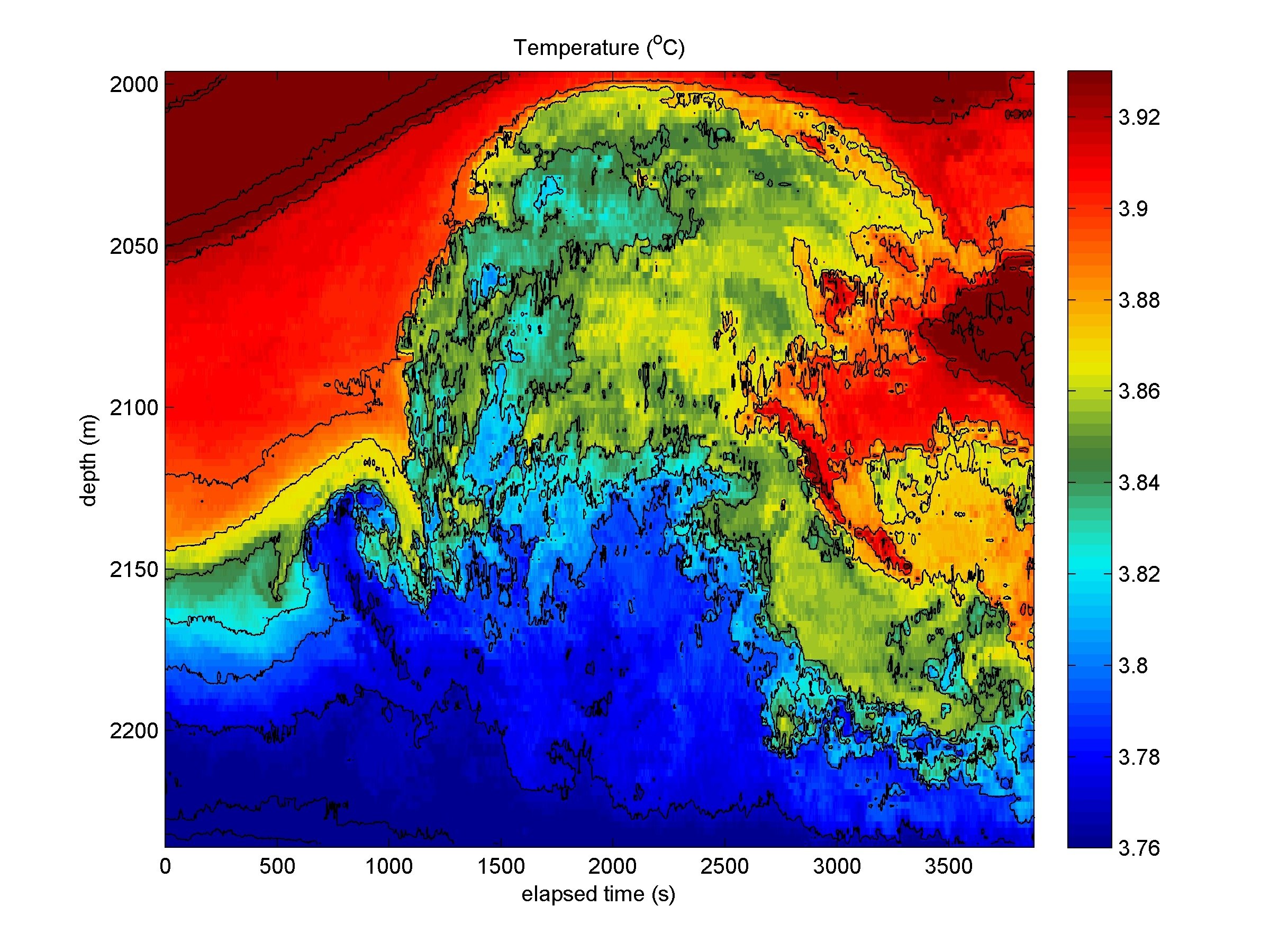
Temporal evolution of internal wave breaking in the Rainbow Ridge, part of the Mid-Atlantic Ridge, North Atlantic Ocean. Measurements were taken by a single mooring deployed from June 28th till July 10th 2016. When the internal wave encounters the steep topography of the ridge, it breaks at around 1200 seconds and causes mixing and dissipation of heat. Modified from van Haren, et al. (2017)

Internal wave breaking is a process during which internal gravity waves attain a large amplitude compared to their length scale, become nonlinearly unstable and finally break. This process is accompanied by turbulent dissipation and mixing. As internal gravity waves carry energy and momentum from the environment of their inception, breaking and subsequent turbulent mixing affects the fluid characteristics in locations of breaking. Consequently, internal wave breaking influences even the large scale flows and composition in both the ocean and the atmosphere. In the atmosphere, momentum deposition by internal wave breaking plays a key role in atmospheric phenomena such as the Quasi-Biennial Oscillation and the Brewer-Dobson Circulation. In the deep ocean, mixing induced by internal wave breaking is an important driver of the meridional overturning circulation. On smaller scales, breaking-induced mixing is important for sediment transport and for nutrient supply to the photic zone. Most breaking of oceanic internal waves occurs in continental shelves, well below the ocean surface, which makes it a difficult phenomenon to observe.

The contribution of breaking internal waves to many atmospheric and ocean processes makes it important to parametrize their effects in weather and climate models.

== Breaking mechanisms ==
Similar to what happens to surface gravity waves near a coastline, when internal waves enter shallow waters and encounter steep topography, they steepen and grow in amplitude in a nonlinear process known as shoaling. As the wave travels over topography with increasing height, bed friction leads to internal waves becoming asymmetrical with an increasing steepness. These nonlinear internal waves on a shallow slope are generally referred to as internal bores. Wave height and energy increase until a critical steepness is reached, whereafter the wave breaks by convective, Kelvin-Helmholtz or parametric subharmonic instability. Due to the relatively small density differences (and thus small restoring forces) over the ocean depth, ocean internal waves may reach amplitudes up to around 100 m. Analogous to surface wave breaking in the region known as the surf zone, internal breaking waves dissipate energy in what is known as the internal surf zone.

=== Internal tide breaking ===
Internal tidal waves are internal waves at tidal frequency in the ocean, which are generated by the interaction of the tide with the ocean topography. Alongside internal inertial waves, they constitute the majority of the ocean internal wavefield. The internal tides consist of so-called low modes and high modes with varying vertical wavelengths. As these waves propagate, the high modes tend to dissipate their energy quickly, leading to the low modes to dominate further away from the location of their generation. Low mode internal waves, with wavelengths exceeding 100 km, generated by either tides or winds acting on the sea surface, can travel thousands of kilometers from their regions of generation, where they will eventually encounter sloping topography and break. When this happens, isopycnals become steeper and steeper, where the wavefront is followed by a sharp temperature drop. This then leads to an unstable density profile that eventually overturns and breaks. The magnitude of the topographic slope and the slope of the internal wave beam dictate where internal waves break.

The slope of an internal wave beam ($r$) can be expressed as the ratio between its horizontal ($k$) and vertical ($m$) wavenumbers:

$r = \Bigg| \frac{k}{m} \Bigg| = \sqrt{\frac{\omega^2-f^2}{N^2-\omega^2}}$

where $N$ is the buoyancy frequency (or Brunt-Väisälä frequency), $f$ is the Coriolis frequency and $\omega$ is the wave frequency in the dispersion relation that governs the propagation of internal waves in a continuously stratified and rotating medium:

$\omega^2 = \frac{N^2k^2 + f^2m^2}{k^2+m^2}$.

In the case that the slope of a downgoing incident internal wave beam is larger than the topographic slope (supercritical slope), waves will be reflected downward. In the case that the slope of a downgoing incident internal wave beam is smaller than the topographic slope (subcritical slope), however, waves will be reflected upward with reduced wavelength and lower group velocity. Because the energy flux is conserved during reflection, energy density and therefore wave amplitude in the reflected wave must increase with respect to the incident wave. This increase in amplitude and wave steepness results in the waves being subject to breaking. These effects are increased the closer the slope of the internal wave beam is to the magnitude of the topographic slope. When the slope of the beam of the incoming internal wave is equal to the topographic slope, the slope of the topography is referred to as the critical slope. Critical slopes and near-critical slopes are important locations for both wave breaking and wave generation via tide-topography interactions.

=== Internal solitary wave breaking ===
Owing to the generally long distances traveled by internal tidal waves, they may steepen and form trains of internal solitary waves, or internal solitons. These internal solitons have much shorter wavelengths, on the order of hundreds of meters, making them much steeper than internal tides. The ratio of the topographic slope to the wave steepness can be characterized by the internal Iribarren number:

$\xi = \frac{s}{\sqrt{a/\lambda}}$

where $s$ is the topographical slope, $a$ the internal wave amplitude and $\lambda$ the wavelength of the internal wave. The internal Iribarren number can be used to classify internal bores into two categories: canonical bores and non-canonical bores. For a gentle slope, as is typical for the continental shelf and nearshore areas, the internal Iribarren number is low ($\xi << 1$) such that canonical bores occur. In this case, an incoming internal solitary wave can convert to a packet of solitary waves or boluses as it travels up the slope in a process referred to as fission. This is also called a fission breaker. Canonical bores are generally accompanied by an intense drop in temperature as the wavefront passes by, followed by a gradual increase over time.

In rarer cases, non-canonical ($\xi = O (1)$) bores may occur. In these cases, for an increasing internal Iribarren number (that is, steeper waves or steeper topographic slope), wave breaking can be classified successively as surging, collapsing and plunging breakers (see Breaking wave). Contrary to canonical bores, temperature gradually decreases as the wavefront passes by, followed by a sharp increase in temperature. Due to the steeper topographic slopes associated with non-canonical bores, a larger part of the wave energy is reflected back, meaning there is less turbulent energy that leads to mixing.

== Mixing ==
Breaking internal waves are regarded to play an important role on mixing of the ocean based on lab experiments and remote sensing. The effect of internal waves on mixing is also studied extensively in direct numerical simulations. Even though research indicates that internal wave breaking is important for local turbulence, there remains uncertainty in global estimates.

Breaking internal tidal waves can result in turbulent water columns of several hundred meters high and the turbulent kinetic energy may reach levels up to 10.000 times higher than in the open ocean.

=== Quantifying mixing efficiency ===
The intensity of the turbulence caused by breaking internal waves depends mainly on the ratio between topographical steepness and the wave steepness, known as the internal Iribarren number. A smaller internal Iribarren number correlates with a larger intensity of the resulting turbulence due to internal wave breaking. That means that a small internal Iribarren number predicts that a lot of the wave energy will be transferred to mixing and turbulence, while a large internal Iribarren number predicts that the wave energy will reflect offshore.

Studies express the mixing efficiency as the ratio between the total amount of mixing and the total irreversible energy loss. In other words, the mixing efficiency can generally be defined as the following ratio:

$\gamma = \frac{\Delta V}{E}$,

where $\gamma$ is the mixing efficiency, $\Delta V$ the change in background potential energy due to mixing and $E$ the total energy expended. Because $\Delta V$ and $E$ are not directly observable, studies use different definitions to determine the mixing efficiency.

It is notoriously hard to estimate the mixing efficiency in the ocean, due to practical limitations in measuring ocean dynamics. Besides measurements of ocean dynamics, the mixing efficiency can also be obtained from lab experiments and numerical simulations, but they also have their limitations. Therefore, these three different approaches have slightly different definitions of mixing efficiency. In theory these three approaches should give the same estimates for the mixing efficiency, but there remain discrepancies between them. Therefore, there are varying estimates and disagreements on mixing efficiency and comparisons are difficult due to the different definitions.

Studies that quantify the mixing properties of breaking internal solitary waves have split estimates of the mixing efficiency range, with values between 5% and 25% for laboratory experiments or between 13% and 21% for numerical simulations depending on the Internal Iribarren number.

=== Mass and sediment transport ===
Breaking and shoaling of internal waves have been shown to cause the transport of mass and energy in the form of sediment and heat, but also of nutrients, plankton and other forms of marine life.

==== Sediment transport ====
Wave breaking causes mass and sediment transport that is important for the ocean biology and shaping of the continental shelves due to erosion. The erosion caused by internal wave breaking can result in sediment to be suspended and transported off-shore. This off-shore sediment transport may give rise to the emergence of nepheloid layers, which are in turn important for the ocean biology. Direct numerical simulations show that breaking internal waves are also responsible for on-shore sediment transport, after which sediment can be deposited or transported elsewhere.

Although many studies show that internal wave breaking leads to sediment transport, their traces in the geologic record remain uncertain. Their sedimentary structures may coexist in turbidites on continental slopes and canyons.

==== Transport of nutrients ====
The mixing and transport of nutrients in the ocean is affected largely by internal wave breaking. The arrival of internal tidal bores has been shown to cause a 10 to 40 fold increase of nutrients on Conch Reef. Here it has been shown that the appearance of internal bores provide a predictable and periodic source of transport that can be important for a diversity of marine life. Large amplitude tidal internal tidal waves can cause sediments to be resuspended for as long as 5 hours each tidal wave and internal bores have shown to play a vital role in the onshore transportation of planktonic larvae.

Internal wave breaking may also cause ecological hazards, such as red tides and low dissolved oxygen levels.
