= Mot (band) =

South Korean indie rock band

- Origin: South Korea
- Genres: Indie rock
- Years active: 1996-present
- Labels: Your Summer
- Members: Eaeon; Cho Namyeol; Yoo Woongryeol; Song Inseob; Lee Hayoon
- Past members: Z.EE

Mot (Korean: 못) is a South Korean rock band. The band currently consists of Eaeon, Cho Namyeol, Yoo Woongryeol, Song Inseob and Lee Hayoon. Since their formation in 1996, the band has released 3 studio albums Non-Linear (비선형) (2004), Strange Season (이상한 계절) (2007) and Ashcraft (재의 기술) (2016).

== Career ==
Mot was first formed in 1996 as Eaeon's one-man band. The band name is derived from 연못 (Yeonmot), the Korean word for pond. He posted "Looking for someone who likes Portishead, Radiohead, Smashing Pumpkins and does stylish music with jazz, electronica, rock, and trip hop." on the internet in 2001, and guitarist Z.EE contacted him, and the band became a duo.

They released their first studio album Non-Linear (비선형) in 2004. The album was praised by critics and ranked 59th on the top 100 Korean albums led by Kyunghyang Shinmun. They participated in the soundtrack of the 2004 film Some. They won the Rookie of the Year award at the 2005 Korean Music Awards.

They released their second album Strange Season (이상한 계절) in 2007, and the album won best modern rock album at the 2008 Korean Music Awards. But the band has on hiatus with Eaeon's vocal cord nodule and Z.EE's departure from the band in 2008. Eaeon returned as a solo musician, releasing his first solo studio album Guilt-Free in 2012.

In 2015, session members from Eaeon's solo project Cho Namyeol, Yoo Wooongryeol, Song Inseob, and Lee Hayoon joined Mot as new members, and they announced their return with a performance at the Grand Mint Festival. In 2016, they released their third studio album Ashcraft (재의 기술). IZM's Lee Kiseon described the band as "Mot, and musicians of the same kind, know exactly how it works. We are still sick and sad, but we received the power to endure for another time, responding to and struggling with that despair." during the album review. In 2017, they hosted a collaboration fashion show with A.AV.

== Discography ==
=== Albums ===
- Non-Linear (비선형) (2004)
- Strange Season (이상한 계절) (2007)
- Ashcraft (재의 기술) (2016)
