= 5-Pyrimidyl alkanol =

Class of chemical compounds

5-Pyrimidyl alkanols are a class of chemical compounds. Asymmetric autocatalysis of pyrimidyl alkanols with diisopropylzinc can amplify a tiny enantiomeric excess (ee) to over 99.5% ee in a unique autocatalytic chiral reaction. The process was discovered by Kenso Soai, one of the winners of the Nobel Prize for Chemistry in 2026, and may model the origin of biological homochirality.
