= Hyperpositive nonlinear effect =

Translation of the wiki page that was in French langage

A hyperpositive nonlinear effect is a very specific case of a nonlinear effect. A nonlinear effect in asymmetric catalysis is a phenomenon in which the enantiopurity of the catalyst (or chiral auxiliary) is not proportional to the enantiopurity of the product obtained. These phenomena were rationalized in the mid-1980s by Henri B. Kagan, who proposed simple mechanistic models, supported by mathematical models, to model experimental curves.

In 1994, H. B. Kagan and collaborators proposed more elaborate models that more closely resembled the experimental results observed at the time. Using these models, the authors were able to make theoretical predictions about situations that had not been encountered experimentally. An example is a case “where the enantiomeric excess could take on much larger values for a partially resolved ligand than for an enantiomerically pure ligand”. The authors proposed the term “hyperpositive nonlinear effect” to characterize this situation.

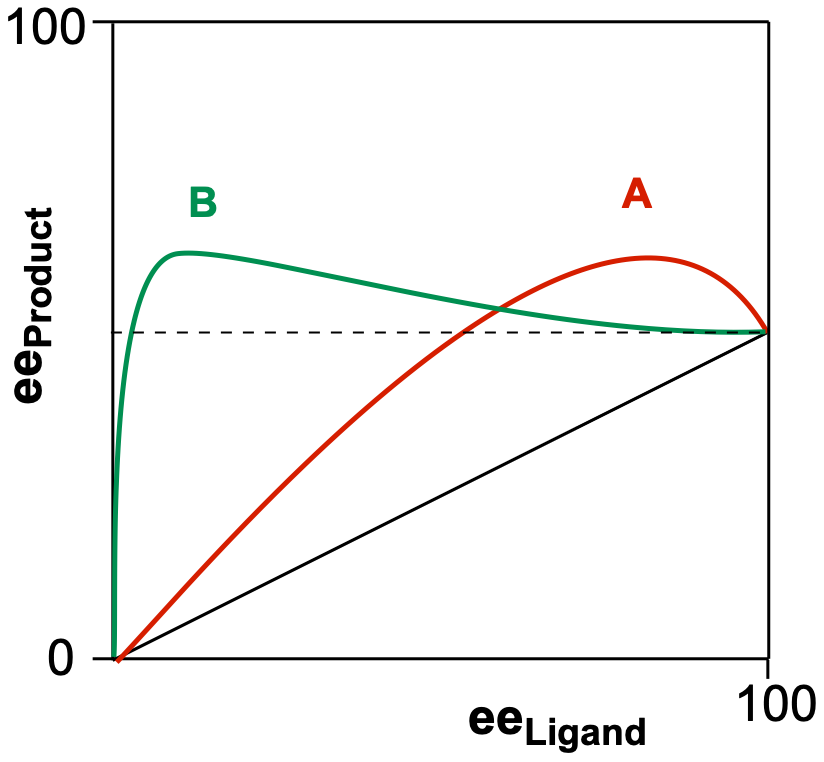
Figure 1. Hyperpositive nonlinear effect. A: Curve shape proposed by Kagan; B: Curve shape observed experimentally by Bellemin-Laponnaz.

This statement may seem somewhat implausible at first glance, but the possibility was observed experimentally 26 years later: the first experimental example of a hyperpositive nonlinear effect was described in 2020 by Stéphane Bellemin-Laponnaz and colleagues. However, the shape of the curve turned out to be very different. Figure 1 depicts Kagan's original proposal (A) and Bellemin-Laponnaz's experimental observation (B).

This observation has led to the establishment of a new mechanism for this phenomenon, which differs from the one originally proposed. The NLE, in fact, results from active species distributed across different aggregation levels. This mechanism, which explains a hyperpositive nonlinear effect, has also been validated to explain cases of enantiodivergence.
