= Linear medium =

Linear medium may refer to:

- A material with linear elasticity
- An optical medium that obeys linear optics

== See also ==
- Nonlinear medium
