= Soai reaction =

Chemical reaction

In organic chemistry, the Soai reaction is the alkylation of pyrimidine-5-carbaldehyde, a 5-pyrimidyl alkanol, with diisopropylzinc. The reaction is autocatalytic and leads to rapidly increasing amounts of the same enantiomer of the product. The product pyrimidyl alcohol is chiral and induces that same chirality in further catalytic cycles. Starting with a low enantiomeric excess ("ee") produces a product with very high enantiomeric excess. The reaction has been studied for clues about the origin of homochirality among certain classes of biomolecules.

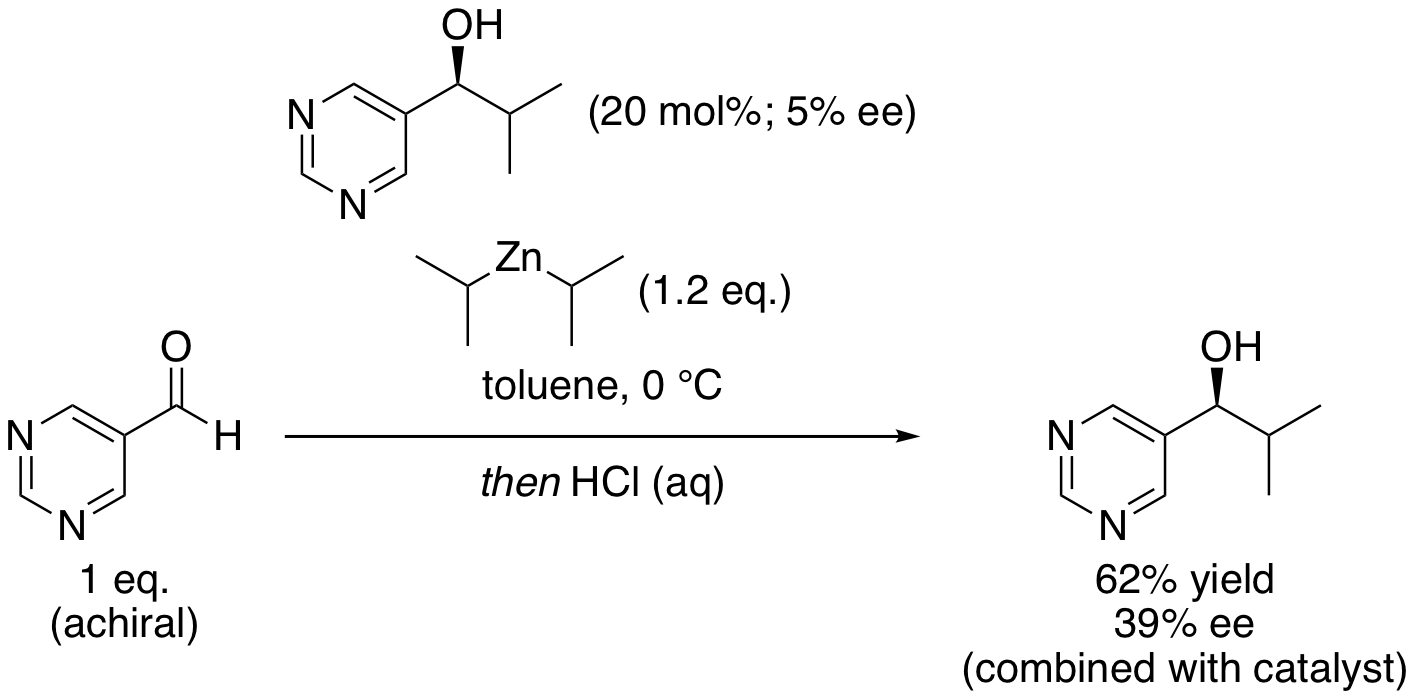

The Japanese chemist Kensō Soai (1950–) discovered the reaction in 1995. For his work in "elucidating the origins of chirality and homochirality", Soai received the Chemical Society of Japan award in 2010, and the Nobel prize in Chemistry in 2026 "for the discovery of non-linear effects and autocatalysis in asymmetric organic synthesis" jointly with Henri B. Kagan.

Other chiral additives can be used as the initial source of asymmetric induction, with the major product of that first reaction being rapidly amplified. For example, Soai's group has demonstrated that even chiral quaternary hydrocarbons, which have no clear Lewis basic site for binding the nucleophile, are nonetheless capable of inducing asymmetric catalysis in the reaction.

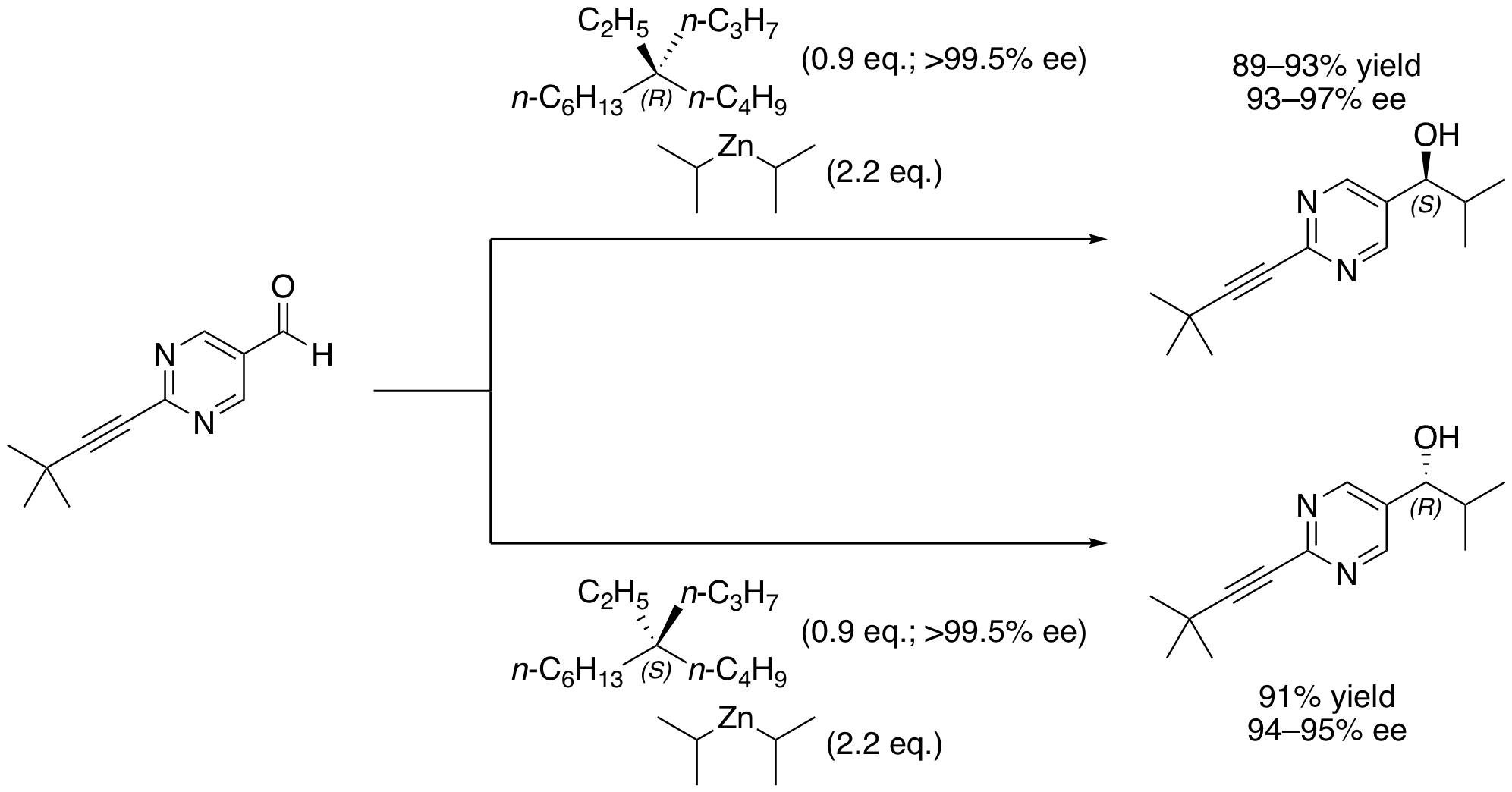

The chiral induction is believed to occur as a result of interactions between the C–H bonds of the alkane and the pi electrons of the aldehyde.

In another example, Soai and coworkers showed that even [^{15}N](2R,3S)-2,3-bis(dimethylamino)butane, whose chirality results solely due to the difference between ^{14}N and ^{15}N (7% isotopic mass difference), gave 45% ee when used as a stoichiometric ligand.
