= Nonlinear medium =

Nonlinear medium may refer to:

- A material with nonlinear elasticity
- An optical medium that obeys nonlinear optics

== See also ==
- Linear medium
