= Non-linear coherent states =

Coherent states are quasi-classical states that may be defined in different ways, for instance as eigenstates of the annihilation operator

$$a|\alpha\rangle=\alpha|\alpha\rangle$$,

or as a displacement from the vacuum

$$|\alpha\rangle=D(\alpha)|0\rangle$$,

where $D(\alpha)=\exp(\alpha a^{\dagger}-\alpha^* a)$ is the Sudarshan-Glauber displacement operator.

One may think of a non-linear coherent state by generalizing the annihilation operator:

$$A=af(a^{\dagger}a)$$,

and then using any of the above definitions by exchanging $a$ by $A$ . The above definition is also known as an $f$-deformed annihilation operator.
