= Eaeon =

South Korean musician (born 1975)

- Birth name: Lee Yonghyeon
- Born: 19 December 1975 (age 49)
- Origin: South Korea
- Genres: Electronica, glitch pop, alternative pop, indie rock
- Years active: 2004–present

Lee Yonghyeon (Korean: 이용현; born 19 December 1975), better known by his stage name Eaeon (이이언; stylised eAeon) is a South Korean glitch pop musician. He is a member of rock band Mot and dream pop duo Night Off. He has been a solo musician since his 2010 single All I Want For Christmas. He released two studio albums: Guilt-Free (2012) and Fragile (2021).

== Career ==
Eaeon was born in 1975 and graduated from Yonsei University and Korea National University of Arts. He formed the band Mot in 2004, which released three studio albums: Non-Linear (비선형) (2004), Strange Season (이상한 계절) (2007) and Ashcraft (재의 기술) (2016). Their first album Non-linear was praised by critics and ranked 59th in the top 100 Korean Music Album led by Kyunghyang Shinmun.

He made his solo debut in 2010 through the single All I Want For Christmas, and released his first solo studio album Guilty-Free in 2012. Kim Banya of IZM reviewed the album as, "Music is effective in stimulating imagination because only concrete manifestations do not have substance. He combines these attributes with literature to carry out new interests and freshness in this album." In December, he released an EP Realize consisting of acoustic songs. Guilt-Free was nominated for the Best Dance & Electronic Album at the 2013 Korean Music Awards.

He featured on Saram12Saram's 2013 EP Raindrop, Cloud, Typhoon and the Sun (빗물구름태풍태양). He formed a duo Night Off with Lee Neungryong, a member of Onnine Ibalgwan, and in 2018, they released an EP The Last Night. He featured tracks from RM's EP Mono the same year. In 2021, he released his second studio album Fragile. He said in an interview that he had a break from panic disorder during 2019: It changed his music style to a way of painstaking rather than an obsessive way, and that the album was a record of escaping from panic disorder. His single Don't (그러지 마) topped iTunes in 76 countries. Fragile was nominated for the Best Pop Album at the 2022 Korean Music Awards.

== Discography ==
=== Solo releases ===
==== Studio albums ====
- Guilt-Free (2012)
- Fragile (2021)

==== EPs ====
- Realize (2012)

=== Mot ===
==== Studio albums ====
- Non-Linear (비선형) (2004)
- Strange Season (이상한 계절) (2007)
- Ashcraft (재의 기술) (2016)

=== Night Off ===
==== EPs ====
- The Last Night (2018)
