= Diisopropylzinc =

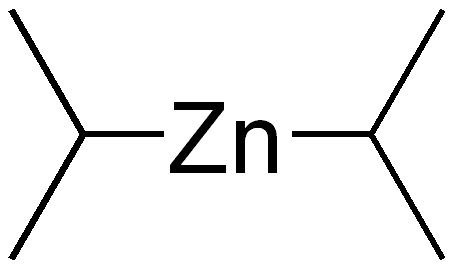

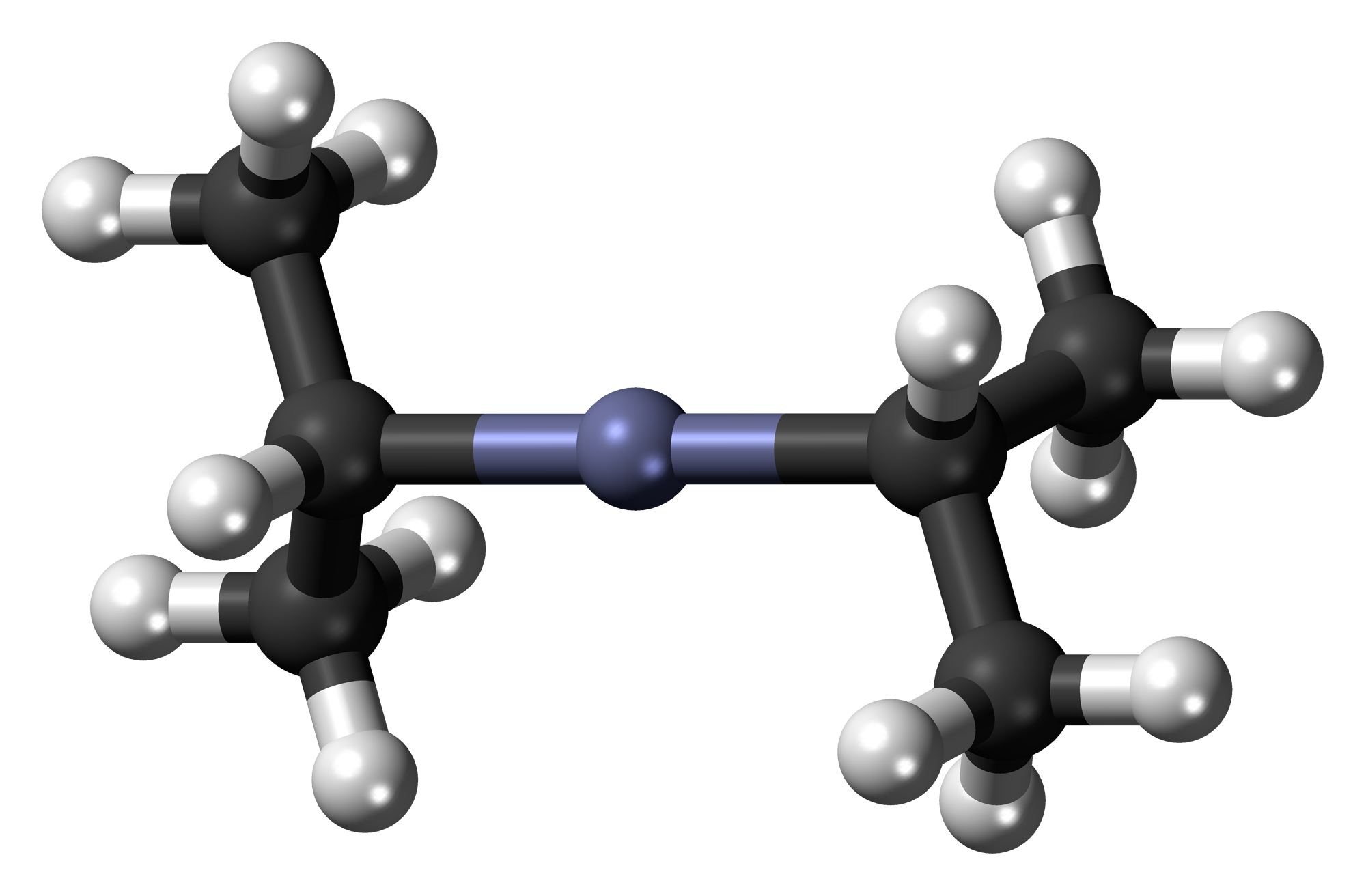

Identifiers
| CAS Number | 625-81-0 |
| 3D model (JSmol) | Interactive image |
| ChemSpider | 11347073 |
| ECHA InfoCard | 100.221.415 |
| PubChem CID | 5207587 |
| UNII | KRU2V5BVQ3 |
| CompTox Dashboard (EPA) | DTXSID10409984 |
- InChI: InChI=1S/2C3H7.Zn/c2*1-3-2;/h2*3H,1-2H3; Key: KDUNMLRPPVCIGP-UHFFFAOYSA-N; InChI=1/2C3H7.Zn/c2*1-3-2;/h2*3H,1-2H3;/rC6H14Zn/c1-5(2)7-6(3)4/h5-6H,1-4H3 Key: KDUNMLRPPVCIGP-LSPCJBSIAV
- SMILES: CC(C)[Zn]C(C)C

Properties
| Chemical formula | C_{6}H_{14}Zn |
| Molar mass | 151.56 g/mol |
| Solubility in water | reacts with water |

Hazards
- GHS labelling
| Pictograms | (GHS02: Flammable) (GHS05: Corrosive) |
| Signal word | Danger |
| Hazard statements | H250, H314 |
| Precautionary statements | P210, P222, P231+P232, P233, P260, P264, P280, P301+P330+P331, P302+P335+P334, P302+P361+P354, P303+P361+P353, P304+P340+P310, P305+P351+P338, P305+P354+P338, P316, P321, P363, P370+P378, P405, P501 |
- Except where otherwise noted, data are given for materials in their standard state (at 25 °C [77 °F], 100 kPa). verify (what is ?) Infobox references

Diisopropylzinc is an organozinc compound with the chemical formula ZnC_{6}H_{14}.

It is the key reagent in the Soai reaction, which is both autocatalytic and enantiospecific. This chemical is pyrophoric, bursting into flame in air or in contact with water. It is generally packaged in toluene.

== Preparation ==
Diisopropylzinc can be obtained by the reaction of zinc bromide with isopropylmagnesium bromide in diethyl ether. The latter can in turn be obtained by the reaction of 2-bromopropane with elemental magnesium.

== Properties ==
Diisopropylzinc is sensitive to air and water and is pyrophoric. Unlike dimethylzinc, which is stable at room temperature under inert conditions, diisopropylzinc decomposes at temperatures above 0 °C.

== Reactions ==
Diisopropylzinc acts as a nucleophile in the Soai reaction. In this process, it adds to compounds such as pyridine-3-carbaldehyde or pyrimidine-5-carbaldehyde. The reaction is notable for proceeding both autocatalytically and enantioselectively, such that a small amount of a product enantiomer exerts a strong induction effect, yielding a high enantiomeric excess starting from a nearly racemic reactant.

Other organozinc compounds can be obtained by reacting an alkyl iodide with diisopropylzinc. While an analogous reaction is also possible with diethylzinc, it requires less mild conditions.
