= Wave nonlinearity =

Feature of surface gravity waves

The nonlinearity of surface gravity waves refers to their deviations from a sinusoidal shape. In the fields of physical oceanography and coastal engineering, the two categories of nonlinearity are skewness and asymmetry. Wave skewness and asymmetry occur when waves encounter an opposing current or a shallow area. As waves shoal in the nearshore zone, in addition to their wavelength and height changing, their asymmetry and skewness also change. Wave skewness and asymmetry are often implicated in ocean engineering and coastal engineering for the modelling of random sea states, in particular regarding the distribution of wave height, wavelength and crest length. For practical engineering purposes, it is important to know the probability of these wave characteristics in seas and oceans at a given place and time. This knowledge is crucial for the prediction of extreme waves, which are a danger for ships and offshore structures. Satellite altimeter Envisat RA-2 data shows geographically coherent skewness fields in the ocean and from the data has been concluded that large values of skewness occur primarily in regions of large significant wave height.

At the nearshore zone, skewness and asymmetry of surface gravity waves are the main drivers for sediment transport.

== Skewness and asymmetry ==
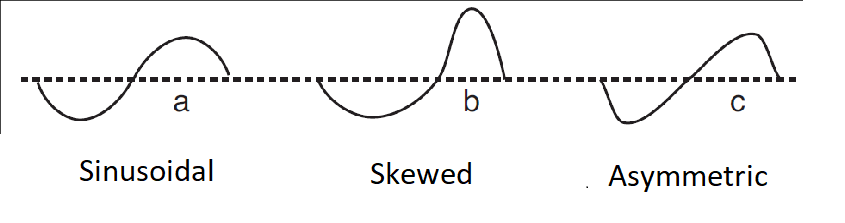
a) sinusoidal, b) skewed and c) asymmetric wave shape

Sinusoidal waves (or linear waves) are waves having equal height and duration during the crest and the trough, and they can be mirrored in both the crest and the trough. Due to Non-linear effects, waves can transform from sinusoidal to a skewed and asymmetric shape.

=== Skewed waves ===
In probability theory and statistics, skewness refers to a distortion or asymmetry that deviates from a normal distribution. Waves that are asymmetric along the horizontal axis are called skewed waves. Asymmetry along the horizontal axis indicates that the wave crest deviates from the wave trough in terms of duration and height. Generally, skewed waves have a short and high wave crest and a long and flat wave trough. A skewed wave shape results in larger orbital velocities under the wave crest compared to smaller orbital velocities under the wave trough. For waves having the same velocity variance, the ones with higher skewness result in a larger net sediment transport.

=== Asymmetric waves ===
Waves that are asymmetric along the vertical axis are referred to as asymmetric waves. Wave asymmetry indicates the leaning forward or backward of the wave, with a steep front face and a gentle rear face. A steep front correlates with an upward tilt, a steep back is correlated with a downward tilt. The duration and height of the wave-crest equal the duration and height of the wave-trough. An asymmetric wave shape results in a larger acceleration between trough and crest and a smaller acceleration between crest and trough.

=== Mathematical description ===
Skewness (Sk) and asymmetry (As) are measures of the wave nonlinearity and can be described in terms of the following parameters:

$Sk = \frac{\langle\eta^{3}\rangle}{\langle\eta^2\rangle^{\frac{3}{2}}}$

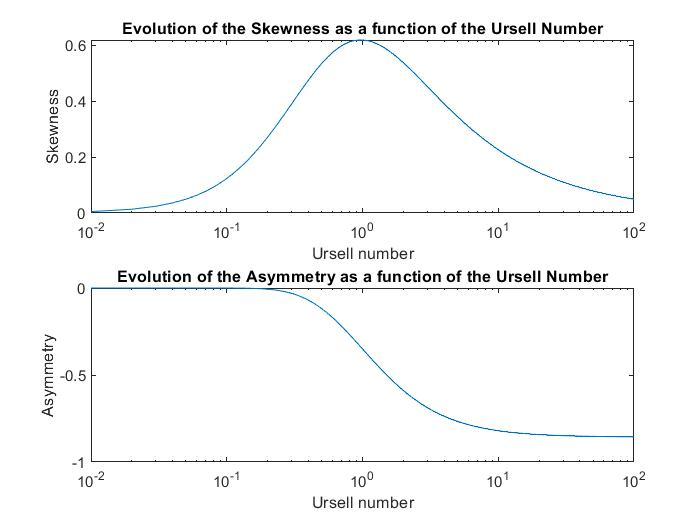
Skewness (top) and Asymmetry (bottom) plotted against the Ursell number on a logarithmic scale.

$As = \frac{\langle\mathcal{H}(\eta)^{3}\rangle}{\langle\eta^2\rangle^{\frac{3}{2}}}$

In which:

- $\eta$ is the zero-mean wave surface elevation
- $\mathcal{H}$ is the Hilbert transform
- $\langle\cdot\rangle$ the angle brackets indicate averaging over many waves

Values for the skewness are positive with typical values between 0 and 1, where values of 1 indicate high skewness. Values for asymmetry are negative with typical values between -1.5 and 0, where values of -1.5 indicate high asymmetry.

== Ursell number ==
The Ursell number, named after Fritz Ursell, relates the skewness and asymmetry and quantifies the degree of sea surface elevation nonlinearity. Ruessink et al. defined the Ursell number as:

$Ur = \frac{3}{8}\frac{H_{m0}k}{(kh)^3}$,

where $H_{m0}$ is the local significant wave height, $k$ is the local wavenumber and $h$ is the mean water depth.

The skewness and asymmetry at a certain location nearshore can be predicted from the Ursell number by:

$Sk = B*\cos(\psi)$

$As = B*\sin(\psi)$

$\textrm{where} \; B = \frac{0.857}{1 + \exp(\frac{-0.471 - \log(Ur)}{0.297})}, \; \textrm{ and } \; \psi = -90^{\circ} + 90^{\circ}\tanh(\frac{0.8150}{Ur^{0.672}})$

For small Ursell numbers, the skewness and asymmetry both approach zero and the waves have a sinusoidal shape, and thus waves having small Ursell numbers do not result in net sediment transport. For $Ur \sim 1$, the skewness is maximum and the asymmetry is small and the waves have a skewed shape. For large Ursell numbers, the skewness approaches 0 and the asymmetry is maximum, resulting in an asymmetric wave shape. In this way, if the wave shape is known, the Ursell number can be predicted and consequently the size and direction of sediment transport at a certain location can be predicted.

== Impact on sediment transport ==
The nearshore zone is divided into the shoaling zone, surf zone and swash zone. In the shoaling zone, the wave nonlinearity increases due to the decreasing depth and the sinusoidal waves approaching the coast will transform into skewed waves. As waves propagate further towards the coast, the wave shape becomes more asymmetric due to wave breaking in the surf zone until the waves run up on the beach in the swash zone.

Skewness and asymmetry are not only observed in the shape of the wave, but also in the orbital velocity profiles beneath the waves. The skewed and asymmetric velocity profiles have important implications for sediment transport in shallow conditions, where it both affects the bedload transport as the suspended load transport. Skewed waves have higher flow velocities under the crest of the waves than under the trough, resulting in a net onshore sediment transport as the high velocities under the crest are much more capable of moving large sediments. Beneath waves with high asymmetry, the change from onshore to offshore flow is more gradual than from offshore to onshore, where sediments are stirred up during peaks in offshore velocity and are transported onshore because of the sudden change in flow direction. The local sediment transport generates nearshore bar formation and provides a mechanism for the generation of three-dimensional features such as rip currents and rhythmic bars.

== Models including wave skewness and asymmetry ==
Two different approaches exist to include wave shape in models: the phase-averaged approach and the phase-resolving approach. With the phase-averaged approach, wave skewness and asymmetry are included based on parameterizations. Phase-averaged models incorporate the evolution of wave frequency and direction in space and time of the wave spectrum. Examples of these kinds of models are WAVEWATCH3 (NOAA) and SWAN (TU Delft). WAVEWATCH3 is a global wave forecasting model with a focus on the deep ocean. SWAN is a nearshore model and mainly has coastal applications. Advantages of phase-averaged models are that they compute wave characteristics over a large domain, they are fast and they can be coupled to sediment transport models, which is an efficient tool to study morphodynamics.

== See also ==
- Infragravity waves
- Wind waves
- Wind stress
- Sediment transport
