= Henri B. Kagan =

French chemist (born 1930)

- Born: Henri Boris Kagan; 15 December 1930 (age 95); Boulogne-Billancourt, France
- Education: University of Paris; École nationale supérieure de chimie de Paris; Collège de France (PhD)
- Awards: Wolf Prize in Chemistry (2001); Ryoji Noyori Prize (2002); Nobel Prize in Chemistry (2026)
- Scientific career
- Fields: Asymmetric catalysis
- Workplaces: Université Paris-Saclay

Henri Boris Kagan (French: [ɑ̃ʁi kaɡɑ̃]; born 15 December 1930) is a French chemist. He is currently an emeritus professor at the Université Paris-Saclay in France. He is widely recognized as a pioneer in the field of asymmetric catalysis. His discoveries have had far-reaching impacts on the pharmaceutical industry.

In 2026, he was jointly awarded the Nobel Prize in Chemistry with Kensō Soai "for the discovery of non-linear effects and autocatalysis in asymmetric organic synthesis."

== Early life and education ==
Kagan was born on 15 December 1930 in Boulogne-Billancourt, France, to a Jewish family who survived World War II by hiding in a village in the south of France under assumed names. He graduated from the Sorbonne and École nationale supérieure de chimie de Paris (in 1954). He subsequently completed his PhD under Jean Jacques at the Collège de France in 1960, researching steroid chemistry and stereochemistry. Subsequently, he was a research associate with Alain Horeau. In 1968, Kagan established a laboratory at Orsay. He became an emeritus professor at the Université Paris-Saclay in 1999.

== Academic career ==
Kagan moved to Université Paris-Sud, Orsay where he became a professor. A landmark in his research was the development of C_{2}-symmetric ligands, e.g., DIOP for asymmetric catalysis. This discovery led to the discovery of many related ligands that support catalysts used in a variety of practical applications.

In 1986, Kagan observed the first examples of nonlinear effects in asymmetric catalysis and developed mathematical models to describe the behavior of such catalysts. This result was a major discovery, making non-linear effects a field of chemistry in its own right: not only are they a tool for understanding molecular mechanisms, but they are also discussed in the context of the origin of life (asymmetric amplification). For this work he was awarded the Nobel Prize in Chemistry in 2026.

== Honors and awards ==
Kagan is a member of the French Academy of Sciences, foreign member of the Polish Academy of Sciences in 1994, Fellow of Royal Society of Chemistry in 2003 and honorary member of the Chemical Research Society of India.

He has won many awards in the field including:

- 1967: Le Bel Prize of the Société chimique de France
- 1968: Cahours Prize of the French Academy of Sciences
- 1974: Silver Medal of the French National Scientific Research Center
- 1976: Raymond Berr Prize
- 1989: Prix du rayonnement français
- 1990: Prelog Medal
- 1991: August-Wilhelm-von Hofmann Medal
- 1998: Nagoya Gold Medal in Organic Chemistry
- 1998: Yamada Prize of the Japan Research Foundation for Optically Active Compounds
- 1999: Tetrahedron Prize for Creativity in Organic Chemistry
- 1999: Centenary Prize of the Royal Society of Chemistry
- 2001: Wolf Prize in Chemistry (with Ryōji Noyori and Karl Barry Sharpless)
- 2002: Grand Prize of the Maison de la Chimie Foundation
- 2002: JSPS Award for Eminent Scientists of the Japan Society for the Promotion of Science
- 2002: Ryoji Noyori Prize
- 2005: Benjamin Franklin Medal (Bower Award and Prize for Achievement in Science)
- 2013: Lavoisier Medal of the Société chimique de France
- 2026: Nobel Prize in Chemistry (with Kensō Soai)

=== Honorary doctorates ===
- 1999: University of Bucharest
- 2004: University of Basilicata

=== National honors ===
- 2007: Officer of the National Order of Merit (France)
- 2002: Knight of the Legion of Honour (France)
- 1996: Knight of the National Order of Merit (France)

=== Nobel Prize in Chemistry ===
In 2001, there was some controversy when Kagan was not awarded the Nobel Prize that year, which had been shared by K. Barry Sharpless of the Scripps Research Institute in La Jolla, California, Ryōji Noyori of Nagoya University, Japan, and William S. Knowles, formerly of Monsanto Company in St Louis, Missouri, for work on catalytic asymmetric synthesis. Several French scientists voiced their protests. The French minister for science, Roger-Gérard Schwartzenberg, thought that Kagan, as a pioneer of the field, should also have been honoured. However, the prize can be given to a maximum of three people.

On 7 October 2026, Kagan, along with Kenso Soai, was awarded the Nobel Prize in Chemistry “for the discovery of non-linear effects and autocatalysis in asymmetric organic synthesis”.

The Royal Swedish Academy of Sciences linked the award to the emergence of homochirality, the predominance of one mirror-image form of a molecule. Its announcement identified Kagan's 1986 discovery as a way of producing a larger excess of one mirror-image form than previously thought possible, and described the laureates' discoveries as important for designing reactions used in pharmaceutical manufacture.
