= Atwood number =

Dimensionless number in fluid dynamics

The Atwood number (A) is a dimensionless number in fluid dynamics used in the study of hydrodynamic instabilities in density stratified flows. It is a dimensionless density ratio defined as

$$\mathrm{A} = \frac{\rho_1 - \rho_2} {\rho_1 + \rho_2}$$

where $\rho_1$ is the density of the heavier fluid and $\rho_2$ is the density of the lighter fluid.

== Field of application ==
Atwood number is an important parameter in the study of Rayleigh–Taylor instability and Richtmyer–Meshkov instability. In Rayleigh–Taylor instability, the penetration distance of heavy fluid bubbles into the light fluid is a function of acceleration time scale $\mathrm{A} g t^2$ where $g$ is the gravitational acceleration and $t$ is the time.
