= Sheath instability =

Plasma instability in laboratory plasma

Sheath instability is an instability in a plasma where ions form sheaths near an electrode, making the plasma unstable. It is a type of Rayleigh–Taylor instability. It is given by the formula:
$$\omega ^2 - \left(\frac{ e}{ m }\right)E_0 \left(L_n^{-1} + \frac {n_1'}{n_0}\right)-i{\omega} v_0' = 0$$
