= Rayleigh–Taylor instability =

Unstable behavior of two contacting fluids of different densities

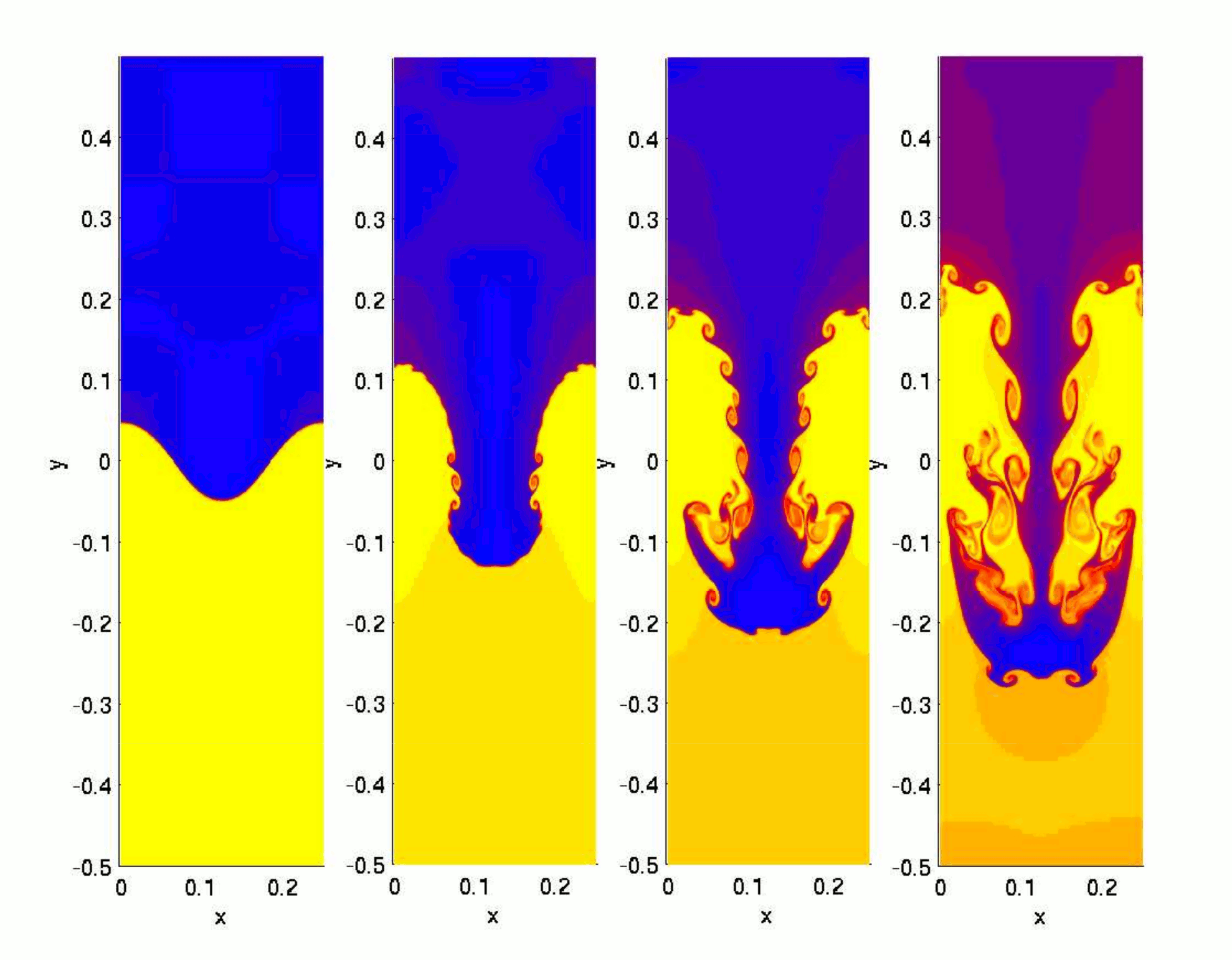
Hydrodynamics simulation of a single "finger" of the Rayleigh–Taylor instability. Note the formation of Kelvin–Helmholtz instabilities, in the second and later snapshots shown (starting initially around the level $y=0$), as well as the formation of a "mushroom cap" at a later stage in the third and fourth frame in the sequence.

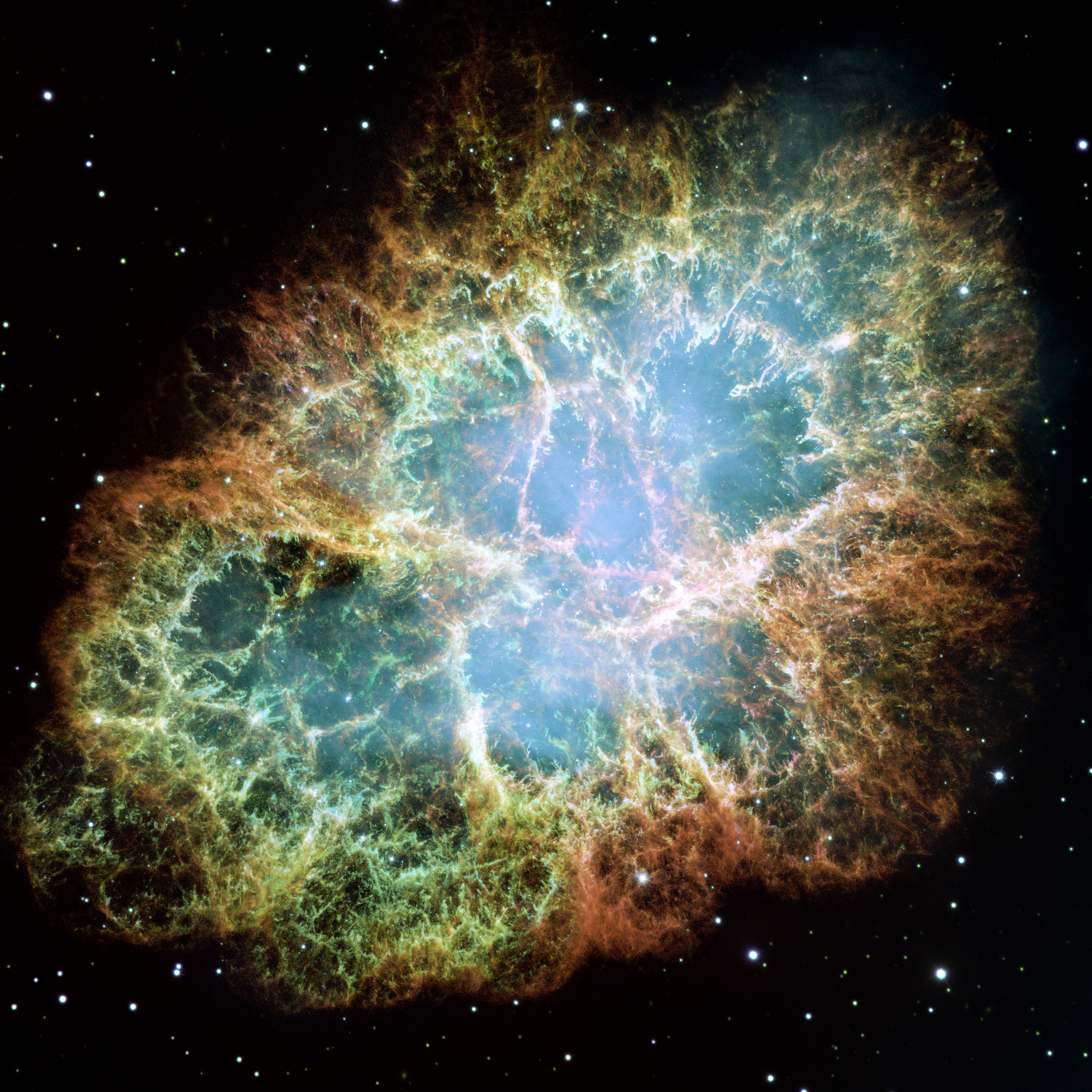
RT instability fingers evident in the Crab Nebula

The Rayleigh–Taylor instability, or RT instability (after Lord Rayleigh and G. I. Taylor), is an instability of an interface between two fluids of different densities which occurs when the lighter fluid is pushing the heavier fluid. Examples include the behavior of water suspended above oil in the gravity of Earth, mushroom clouds like those from volcanic eruptions and atmospheric nuclear explosions, supernova explosions in which expanding core gas is accelerated into denser shell gas, merging binary quantum fluids in metastable configuration, instabilities in plasma fusion reactors and inertial confinement fusion.

== Concept ==
Water suspended atop oil is an everyday example of Rayleigh–Taylor instability, and it may be modeled by two completely plane-parallel layers of immiscible fluid, the denser fluid on top of the less dense one and both subject to the Earth's gravity. The equilibrium here is unstable to any perturbations or disturbances of the interface: if a parcel of heavier fluid is displaced downward with an equal volume of lighter fluid displaced upwards, the potential energy of the configuration is lower than the initial state. Thus the disturbance will grow and lead to a further release of potential energy, as the denser material moves down under the (effective) gravitational field, and the less dense material is further displaced upwards. This was the set-up as studied by Lord Rayleigh. The important insight by G. I. Taylor was his realisation that this situation is equivalent to the situation when the fluids are accelerated, with the less dense fluid accelerating into the denser fluid. This occurs deep underwater on the surface of an expanding bubble and in a nuclear explosion.

As the RT instability develops, the initial perturbations progress from a linear growth phase into a non-linear growth phase, eventually developing "plumes" flowing upwards (in the gravitational buoyancy sense) and "spikes" falling downwards. In the linear phase, the fluid movement can be closely approximated by linear equations, and the amplitude of perturbations is growing exponentially with time. In the non-linear phase, perturbation amplitude is too large for a linear approximation, and non-linear equations are required to describe fluid motions. In general, the density disparity between the fluids determines the structure of the subsequent non-linear RT instability flows (assuming other variables such as surface tension and viscosity are negligible here). The difference in the fluid densities divided by their sum is defined as the Atwood number, A. For A close to 0, RT instability flows take the form of symmetric "fingers" of fluid; for A close to 1, the much lighter fluid "below" the heavier fluid takes the form of larger bubble-like plumes.

This process is evident not only in many terrestrial examples, from salt domes to weather inversions, but also in astrophysics and electrohydrodynamics. For example, RT instability structure is evident in the Crab Nebula, in which the expanding pulsar wind nebula powered by the Crab Pulsar is sweeping up ejected material from the supernova explosion 1000 years ago. The RT instability has also recently been discovered in the Sun's outer atmosphere, or solar corona, when a relatively dense solar prominence overlies a less dense plasma bubble. This latter case resembles magnetically modulated RT instabilities.

Note that the RT instability is not to be confused with the Plateau–Rayleigh instability (also known as Rayleigh instability) of a liquid jet. This instability, sometimes called the hosepipe (or firehose) instability, occurs due to surface tension, which acts to break a cylindrical jet into a stream of droplets having the same total volume but higher surface area.

Many people have witnessed the RT instability by looking at a lava lamp, although some might claim this is more accurately described as an example of Rayleigh–Bénard convection due to the active heating of the fluid layer at the bottom of the lamp.

== Stages of development and eventual evolution into turbulent mixing ==
This figure represents the evolution of the Rayleigh–Taylor instability from small wavelength perturbations at the interface (a) which grow into the ubiquitous mushroom shaped spikes (fluid structures of heavy into light fluid) and bubbles (fluid structures of light into heavy fluid) (b) and these fluid structures interact due to bubble merging and competition (c) eventually developing into a mixing region (d). Here ρ2 represents the heavy fluid and ρ1 represents the light fluid. Gravity is acting downward and the system is RT unstable.

The evolution of the RTI follows four main stages. In the first stage, the perturbation amplitudes are small when compared to their wavelengths, the equations of motion can be linearized, resulting in exponential instability growth. In the early portion of this stage, a sinusoidal initial perturbation retains its sinusoidal shape. However, after the end of this first stage, when non-linear effects begin to appear, one observes the beginnings of the formation of the ubiquitous mushroom-shaped spikes (fluid structures of heavy fluid growing into light fluid) and bubbles (fluid structures of light fluid growing into heavy fluid). The growth of the mushroom structures continues in the second stage and can be modeled using buoyancy drag models, resulting in a growth rate that is approximately constant in time. At this point, nonlinear terms in the equations of motion can no longer be ignored. The spikes and bubbles then begin to interact with one another in the third stage. Bubble merging takes place, where the nonlinear interaction of mode coupling acts to combine smaller spikes and bubbles to produce larger ones. Also, bubble competition takes places, where spikes and bubbles of smaller wavelength that have become saturated are enveloped by larger ones that have not yet saturated. This eventually develops into a region of turbulent mixing, which is the fourth and final stage in the evolution. It is generally assumed that the mixing region that finally develops is self-similar and turbulent, provided that the Reynolds number is sufficiently large.

== Linear stability analysis ==
Base state of the Rayleigh–Taylor instability. Gravity points downwards.

The inviscid two-dimensional Rayleigh–Taylor (RT) instability provides an excellent springboard into the mathematical study of stability because of the simple nature of the base state. Consider a base state in which there is an interface, located at $z=0$ that separates fluid media with different densities, $\rho_1$ for $z<0$ and $\rho_2$ for $z>0$. The gravitational acceleration is described by the vector $\mathbf g = -g\, \mathbf{e}_z$. The velocity field and pressure field in this equilibrium state, denoted with an overbar, are given by

$$\overline{\mathbf v}=\mathbf{0}, \quad \overline p = \begin{cases}-\rho_1 g z \quad \text{for }z<0,\\ -\rho_2 g z \quad \text{for }z>0,\end{cases}$$

where the reference location for the pressure is taken to be at $z = 0$. Let this interface be slightly perturbed, so that it assumes the position $z = f(x,t)$. Correspondingly, the base state is also slightly perturbed. In the linear theory, we can write

$$\mathbf{v} = \overline{\mathbf v} + \hat{\mathbf{v}}(z) e^{ikx+\sigma t}, \quad p = \overline{p} + \hat p(z) e^{ikx+\sigma t}, \quad f =\hat{f} e^{ikx+\sigma t}$$

where $k$ is the real wavenumber in the $x$-direction and $\sigma$ is the growth rate of the perturbation. Then the linear stability analysis based on the inviscid governing equations shows that

$$\sigma^2 = \frac{\rho_2-\rho_1}{\rho_2+\rho_1} gk.$$

Thus, if $\rho_2<\rho_1$, the base state is stable and while if $\rho_2>\rho_1$, it is unstable for all wavenumbers. If the interface has a surface tension $\gamma$, then the dispersion relation becomes

$$\sigma^2 = \frac{\rho_2-\rho_1}{\rho_2+\rho_1}gk - \frac{\gamma k^3}{\rho_2+\rho_1},$$

which indicates that the instability occurs only for a range of wavenumbers $0<k<k_c$ where $k_c^2 = (\rho_2-\rho_1)g/\gamma$; that is to say, surface tension stabilises large wavenumbers or small length scales. Then the maximum growth rate occurs at the wavenumber $k_m = k_c/\sqrt 3$ and its value is

$$\sigma_m^2 = \frac{2\gamma}{\rho_2+\rho_1} \left[\frac{\left(\rho_2-\rho_1\right) g}{3\gamma}\right]^{3/2}.$$

Details of the linear stability analysis. A similar derivation appears in Chandrasekhar 1981, §92, pp. 433–435.

The perturbation introduced to the system is described by a velocity field of infinitesimally small amplitude, $(u'(x,z,t),w'(x,z,t)).\,$ Because the fluid is assumed incompressible, this velocity field has the streamfunction representation

$$\mathbf{u}' = (u'(x,z,t), w'(x,z,t)) = (\psi_z, -\psi_x),\,$$

where the subscripts indicate partial derivatives. Moreover, in an initially stationary incompressible fluid, there is no vorticity, and the fluid stays irrotational, hence $\nabla \times \mathbf{u}'=0\,$. In the streamfunction representation, $\nabla^2\psi=0.\,$ Next, because of the translational invariance of the system in the x-direction, it is possible to make the ansatz

$$\psi\left(x,z,t\right) = e^{i\alpha\left(x-ct\right)}\Psi\left(z\right),\,$$

where $\alpha$ is a spatial wavenumber. Thus, the problem reduces to solving the equation

$$\left(D^2-\alpha^2\right)\Psi_j=0,\,\,\,\ D=\frac{d}{dz},\,\,\,\ j=L,G.\,$$

The domain of the problem is the following: the fluid with label 'L' lives in the region $-\infty<z\leq 0\,$, while the fluid with the label 'G' lives in the upper half-plane $0\leq z<\infty\,$. To specify the solution fully, it is necessary to fix conditions at the boundaries and interface. This determines the wave speed c, which in turn determines the stability properties of the system.

The first of these conditions is provided by details at the boundary. The perturbation velocities $w'_i\,$ should satisfy a no-flux condition, so that fluid does not leak out at the boundaries $z = \pm\infty.\,$ Thus, $w_L'=0\,$ on $z=-\infty\,$, and $w_G'=0\,$ on $z=\infty\,$. In terms of the streamfunction, this is

$$\Psi_L\left(-\infty\right)=0,\qquad \Psi_G\left(\infty\right)=0.\,$$

The other three conditions are provided by details at the interface $z=\eta\left(x,t\right)\,$.

Continuity of vertical velocity: At $z=\eta$, the vertical velocities match, $w'_L = w'_G\,$. Using the stream function representation, this gives

$$\Psi_L\left(\eta\right)=\Psi_G\left(\eta\right).\,$$

Expanding about $z=0\,$ gives

$$\Psi_L\left(0\right)=\Psi_G\left(0\right)+\text{H.O.T.},\,$$

where H.O.T. means 'higher-order terms'. This equation is the required interfacial condition.

The free-surface condition: At the free surface $z=\eta\left(x,t\right)\,$, the kinematic condition holds:

$$\frac{\partial\eta}{\partial t} + u' \frac{\partial\eta}{\partial x} = w'\left(\eta\right).\,$$

Linearizing, this is simply

$$\frac{\partial\eta}{\partial t}=w'\left(0\right),\,$$

where the velocity $w'\left(\eta\right)\,$ is linearized on to the surface $z=0\,$. Using the normal-mode and streamfunction representations, this condition is $c \eta=\Psi\,$, the second interfacial condition.

Pressure relation across the interface: For the case with surface tension, the pressure difference over the interface at $z=\eta$ is given by the Young–Laplace equation:

$$p_G\left(z=\eta\right) - p_L\left(z=\eta\right) = \sigma\kappa,\,$$

where σ is the surface tension and κ is the curvature of the interface, which in a linear approximation is

$$\kappa = \nabla^2\eta=\eta_{xx}.\,$$

Thus,

$$p_G\left(z{=}\eta\right) - p_L\left({z}=\eta\right) = \sigma\eta_{xx}.\,$$

However, this condition refers to the total pressure (base+perturbed), thus

$$\left[P_G\left(\eta\right)+p'_G\left(0\right)\right] - \left[P_L\left(\eta\right) + p'_L\left(0\right)\right] = \sigma\eta_{xx}.$$

(As usual, The perturbed quantities can be linearized onto the surface z=0.) Using hydrostatic balance, in the form

$$P_L=-\rho_L g z+p_0,\qquad P_G=-\rho_G gz +p_0,\,$$

this becomes

$$p'_G-p'_L = g\eta\left(\rho_G-\rho_L\right)+\sigma\eta_{xx},\qquad\text{on }z = 0.$$

The perturbed pressures are evaluated in terms of streamfunctions, using the horizontal momentum equation of the linearised Euler equations for the perturbations,
$$\frac{\partial u_i'}{\partial t} = - \frac{1}{\rho_i}\frac{\partial p_i'}{\partial x}\,$$
with $i=L,G,\,$ to yield

$$p_i'=\rho_i c D\Psi_i,\qquad i=L,G.\,$$

Putting this last equation and the jump condition on $p'_G-p'_L$ together,

$$c\left(\rho_G D\Psi_G-\rho_L D\Psi_L\right)=g\eta\left(\rho_G-\rho_L\right)+\sigma\eta_{xx}.\,$$

Substituting the second interfacial condition $c\eta=\Psi\,$ and using the normal-mode representation, this relation becomes

$$c^2\left(\rho_G D\Psi_G-\rho_L D\Psi_L\right)=g\Psi\left(\rho_G-\rho_L\right)-\sigma\alpha^2\Psi,\,$$

where there is no need to label $\Psi\,$ (only its derivatives) because $\Psi_L=\Psi_G\,$ at $z=0.\,$

Solution

Now that the model of stratified flow has been set up, the solution is at hand. The streamfunction equation $\left(D^2-\alpha^2\right)\Psi_i=0,\,$ with the boundary conditions $\Psi\left(\pm\infty\right)\,$ has the solution

$$\Psi_L = A_L e^{\alpha z},\qquad \Psi_G = A_G e^{-\alpha z}.\,$$

The first interfacial condition states that $\Psi_L=\Psi_G\,$ at $z=0\,$, which forces $A_L=A_G=A.\,$ The third interfacial condition states that

$$c^2\left(\rho_G D\Psi_G-\rho_L D\Psi_L\right) = g\Psi\left(\rho_G-\rho_L\right)-\sigma\alpha^2\Psi.\,$$

Plugging the solution into this equation gives the relation

$$Ac^2\alpha\left(-\rho_G-\rho_L\right)=Ag\left(\rho_G-\rho_L\right)-\sigma\alpha^2A.\,$$

The A cancels from both sides and we are left with

$$c^2 = \frac{g}{\alpha} \frac{\rho_L-\rho_G}{\rho_L+\rho_G} + \frac{\sigma\alpha}{\rho_L+\rho_G}.\,$$

To understand the implications of this result in full, it is helpful to consider the case of zero surface tension. Then,

$$c^2 = \frac{g}{\alpha} \frac{\rho_L-\rho_G}{\rho_L+\rho_G},\qquad \sigma=0,\,$$

and clearly

- If $\rho_G<\rho_L\,$, $c^2>0\,$ and c is real. This happens when the lighter fluid sits on top;
- If $\rho_G>\rho_L\,$, $c^2<0\,$ and c is purely imaginary. This happens when the heavier fluid sits on top.

Now, when the heavier fluid sits on top, $c^2<0\,$, and

$$c=\pm i \sqrt{\frac{g\mathcal{A}}{\alpha}},\qquad \mathcal{A}=\frac{\rho_G-\rho_L}{\rho_G+\rho_L},\,$$

where $\mathcal{A}\,$ is the Atwood number. By taking the positive solution, we see that the solution has the form

$$\Psi\left(x,z,t\right) = A e^{-\alpha|z|} \exp \left[i\alpha\left(x-ct\right)\right] = A \exp\left(\alpha\sqrt{\frac{g\tilde{\mathcal{A}}}{\alpha}}t\right) \exp\left(i\alpha x - \alpha|z|\right)\,$$

and this is associated to the interface position η by: $c\eta = \Psi$. Now define $B = A/c.\,$

When the two layers of the fluid are allowed to have a relative velocity, the instability is generalized to the Kelvin–Helmholtz–Rayleigh–Taylor instability, which includes both the Kelvin–Helmholtz instability and the Rayleigh–Taylor instability as special cases. It was recently discovered that the fluid equations governing the linear dynamics of the system admit a parity-time symmetry, and the Kelvin–Helmholtz–Rayleigh–Taylor instability occurs when and only when the parity-time symmetry breaks spontaneously.

== Vorticity explanation ==
Visualization of an unstable Rayleigh–Taylor instability configuration where baroclinic torque at the interface creates vorticity and induces a velocity field that increases the baroclinic torque. Here ω is vorticity, p is pressure, ρ is density, u is velocity and g is gravity. The thick circular arrows represent the velocity field created by the vortex.

The RT instability can be seen as the result of baroclinic torque created by the misalignment of the pressure and density gradients at the perturbed interface, as described by the two-dimensional inviscid vorticity equation, $\frac{D\omega}{Dt} = \frac{\nabla \rho \times \nabla p}{\rho ^2}$, where ω is vorticity, ρ density and p is the pressure. In this case the dominant pressure gradient is hydrostatic, resulting from the acceleration.

When in the unstable configuration, for a particular harmonic component of the initial perturbation, the torque on the interface creates vorticity that will tend to increase the misalignment of the gradient vectors. This in turn creates additional vorticity, leading to further misalignment. This concept is depicted in the figure, where it is observed that the two counter-rotating vortices have velocity fields that sum at the peak and trough of the perturbed interface. In the stable configuration, the vorticity, and thus the induced velocity field, will be in a direction that decreases the misalignment and therefore stabilizes the system.

A much simpler explanation of the basic physics of the Rayleigh–Taylor instability was published in 2006.

== Late-time behaviour ==
The analysis in the previous section breaks down when the amplitude of the perturbation is large. The growth then becomes non-linear as the spikes and bubbles of the instability tangle and roll up into vortices. Then, as in the figure, numerical simulation of the full problem is required to describe the system.

== See also ==
- Saffman–Taylor instability
- Darrieus–Landau instability
- Richtmyer–Meshkov instability
- Kelvin–Helmholtz instability
- Mushroom cloud
- Plateau–Rayleigh instability
- Salt fingering
- Hydrodynamic stability
- Kármán vortex street
- Fluid thread breakup
- Rayleigh–Bénard convection
