= Inkjet technology =

Inkjet technology originally was invented for depositing aqueous inks on paper in 'selective' positions based on the ink properties only. Inkjet nozzles and inks were designed together and the inkjet performance was based on a design. It was used as a data recorder in the early 1950s, later in the 1950s co-solvent-based inks in the publishing industry were seen for text and images, then solvent-based inks appeared in industrial marking on specialized surfaces and in the 1990's phase change or hot-melt ink has become a popular with images and digital fabrication of electronic and mechanical devices, especially jewelry. Although the terms "jetting", "inkjet technology" and "inkjet printing", are commonly used interchangeably, inkjet printing usually refers to the publishing industry, used for printing graphical content, while industrial jetting usually refers to general purpose fabrication via material particle deposition.

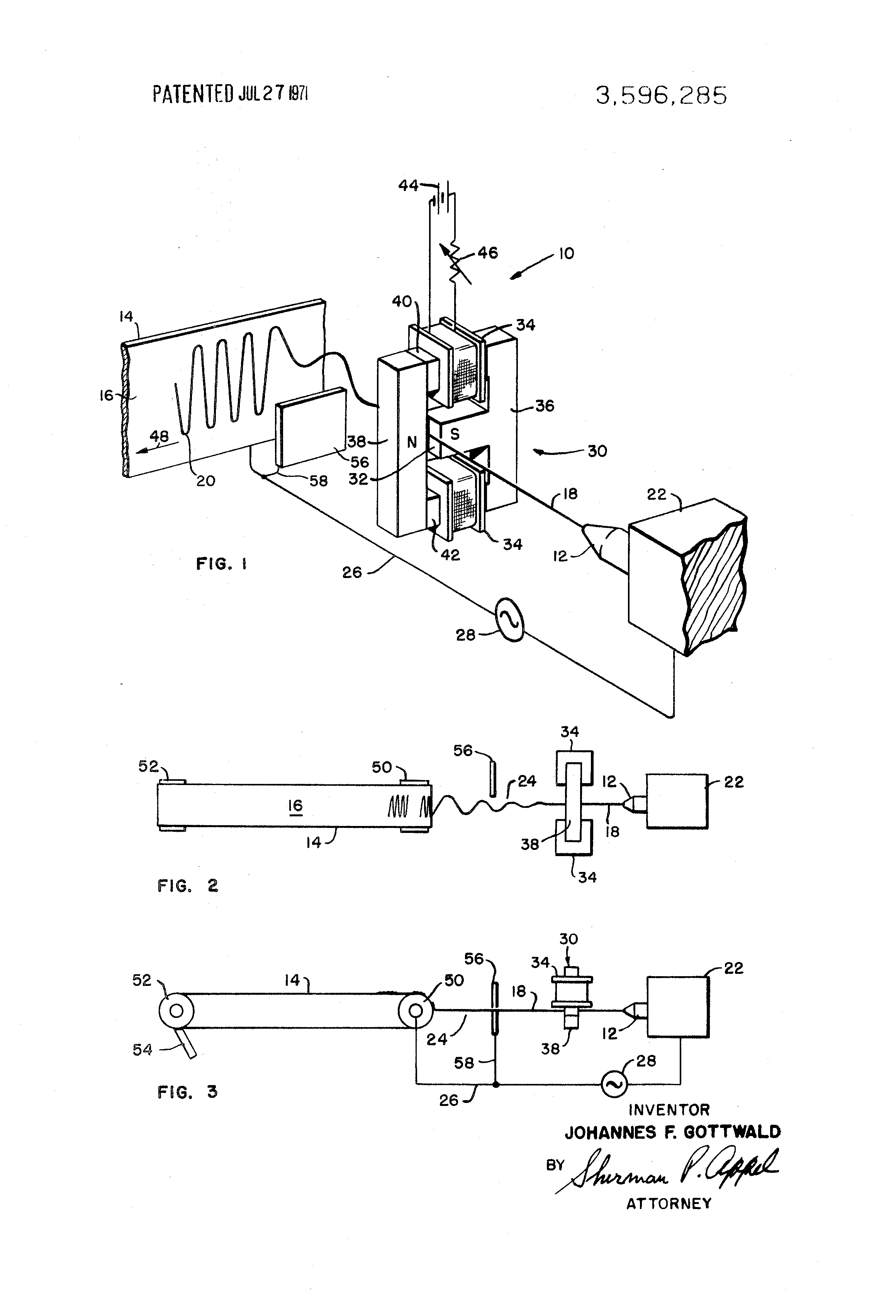
First Liquid Metal Inkjet

Many companies have worked with inkjet over the years. Many patents have been issued and the technology has been used in a number of products. The basic form of the inkjet was a single nozzle with either fluid forced through under pressure, pulled from it by electrical potential or pushed out with the help of a piezo. Single nozzle inkjets will be discussed first in this introduction. Inkjet technology was pioneered by Teletype Corporation in the 1960s which introduced the "electronic pull", high voltage drop extraction from a nozzle, Inktronic Teleprinter in 1965 printing at 120 characters per second (cps) from a row of 40 inkjets using the Charles R. Winston patent, Method and Apparatus for Transferring Inks, 1962, US3,060,429. Teletype experimented with "hot-melt" wax inks as described in a Teletype patent by Johannes F. Gottwald, Liquid Metal Recorder, 1971, US 3,596,285, that outputs a fabricated metal symbol (Stock exchange symbols and quotes) able to be removed from the conveyor carrier and the Bismuth metal alloy reused if desired. The use of Hot-melt inks with a newer Drop-On-Demand inkjet technology(invented by Zoltan in 1972) with these inks would not be seen again until 1984 at Howtek and Exxon.

Howtek was started as R.H Research in 1982 by Robert Howard after successfully growing Centronics, the first dot-matrix solenoid-driven wire ribbon impact printer company in 1968. Howard calculated his solenoid matrix printer was 10-20 times faster than Teletype. Howard had tested making dots on paper by using ultrasonic sound in the late 1960s but did not advance the idea until some 20 years later in 1984 with Howtek when he hired 6 key employees from Exxon to develop his hot-melt color inkjet printer idea..

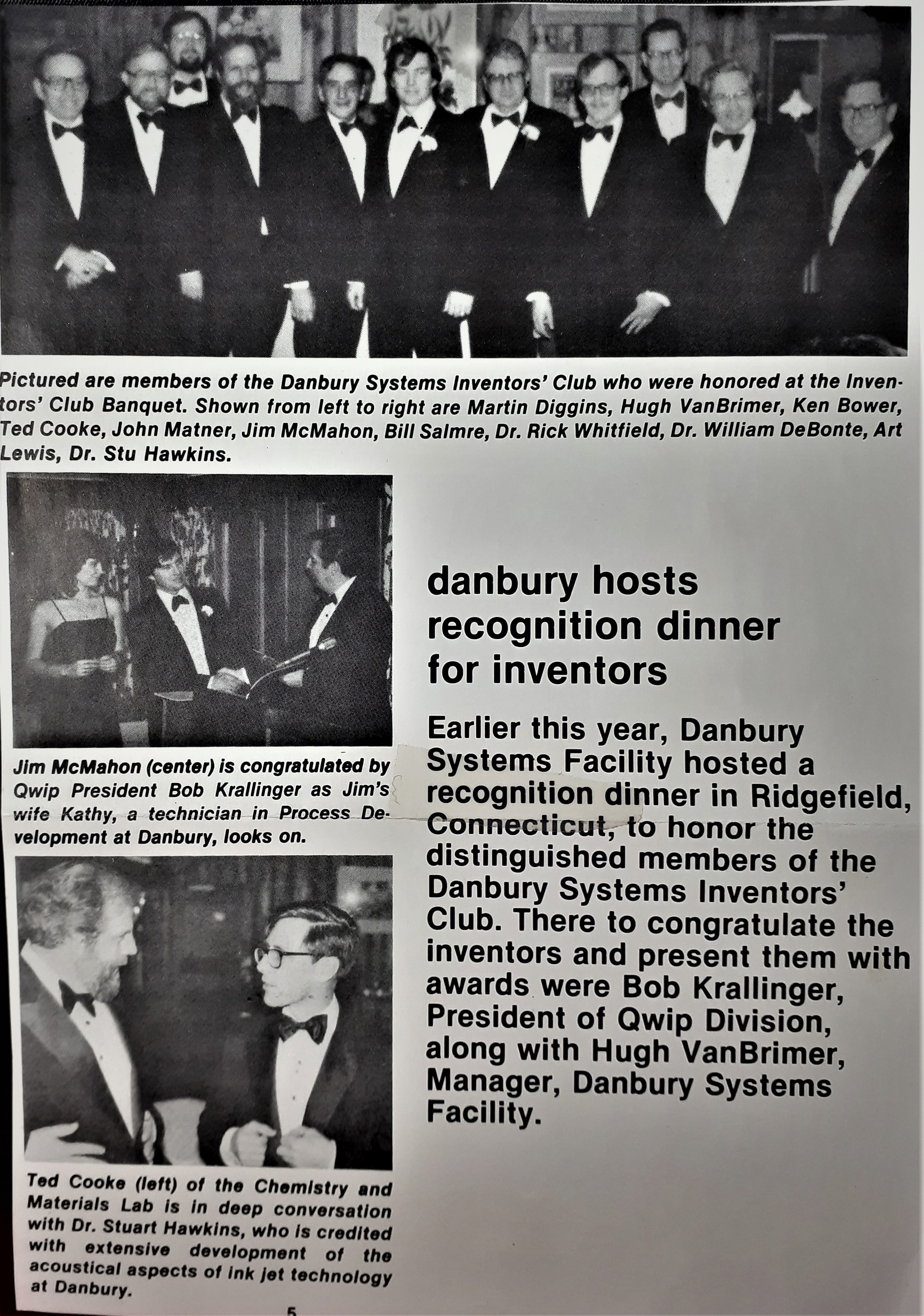
Photo of Inventors Club event

Exxon Office Systems(EOS), Brookfield, Ct plunged into the non-impact printer business in the late 1970s and invested as much as $2 billion. Patent records show a lengthy list of printing background employees at the EOS, Exxon Enterprises, Danbury Systems Division starting in 1978 including Ken Bower who was recruited by Exxon to found the engineering department at Exxon Enterprises. Ken's first job out of college in 1963 was at AT&T's Teletype, Division in Skokie, IL where his job was to transition an electro-mechanical stock exchange ticker (inkjet printer) into production. On his first day of work he smelled wax and was shown a 42 jet printer with heated printheads that was under development. Ken went on to work at UARCO business forms and made associations with developers of On-Demand inkjet, including Steve Zoltan at Gould and Silonics under Ed Kyser and Stephen Sears. Steve Zoltan was using the cylindrical piezoelectric tube with cylindrical compression and Ed Keyser was using a flat piezoelectric diaphragm that squirted ink like an oil can.

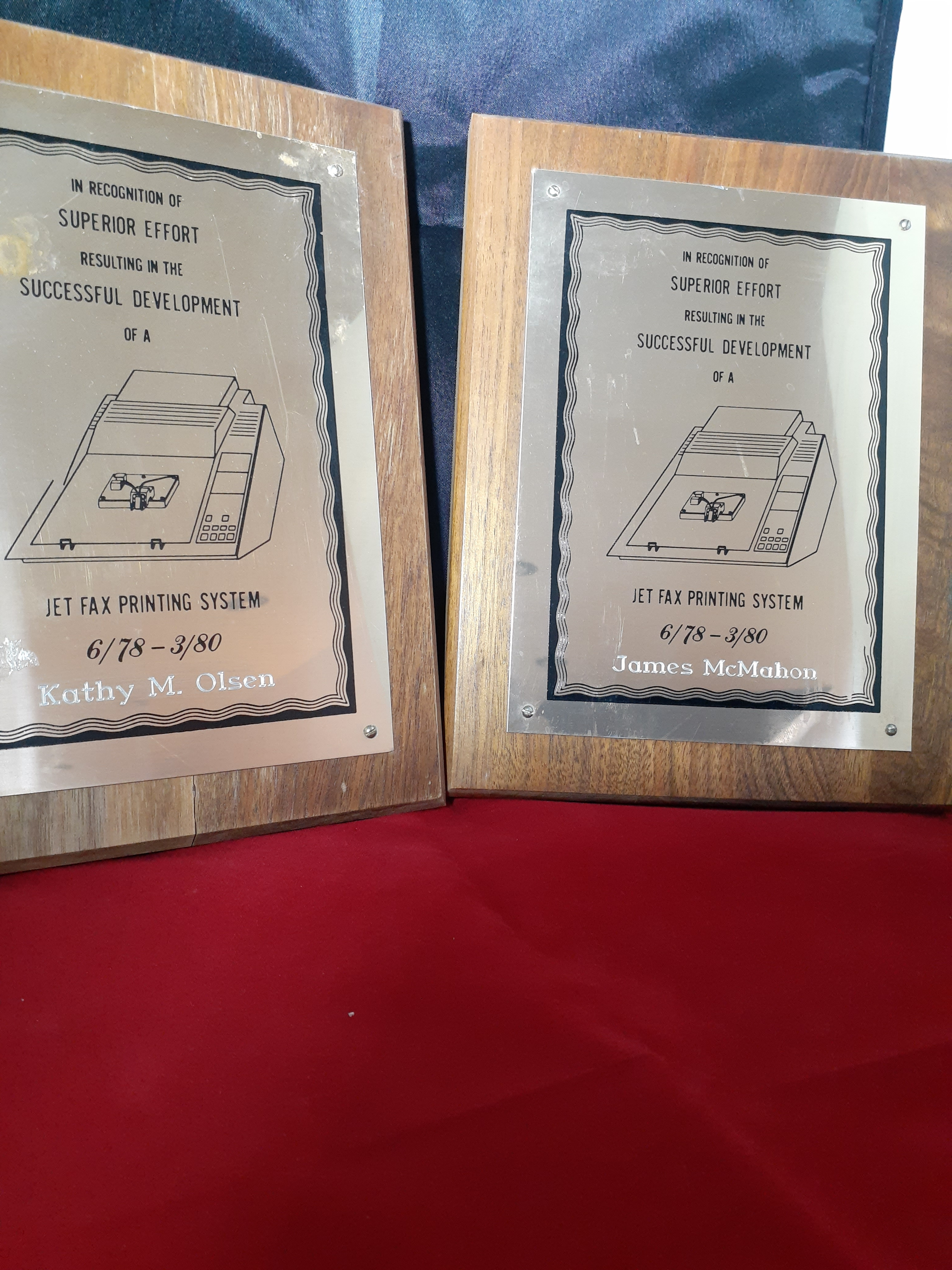
"Alpha Inkjets on Fax Printer" awarded by Exxon Office Systems 1980

Two employees hired at Exxon (EOS) with no experience in printing were James McMahon and Kathy Olson. McMahon was hired to install the first Zoltan style single-nozzle inkjet, code name "Alpha Jet" to a fax printer and Olson was hired to build the "Alpha" jets for fax printer production. McMahon and Olson (married name McMahon) were two of the six employees hired by Robert Howard to design and build on-demand inkjets for the Pixelmaster color printer. Within 6 months of joining R.H Research(name changed to Howtek) the Alpha jet print samples with hot-melt ink were being shown at COMDEX, in Las Vegas. J. McMahon is credited with an Improved Inkjet System using the Zoltan technology at EOS and K. McMahon is credited with nozzle manufacturing techniques at Howtek. J. McMahon went on to work at Sanders Prototype(Solidscape) 3D printer manufacturer and is now employed at Layer Grown Model Technology supporting On-demand single-nozzle inkjets and claims to be the godfather of 3D Inkjet single-nozzle technology as a historian who worked in the field since 1978, not with Steve Zoltan but was the Junior Scientist assistant for John G Martner at EOS and became friends with Ken Bower later in life. 3D Inkjet single-nozzle printing has a direct path from Teletype Corporation where Ken Bower worked, to Howtek, Inc hot-melt inks (Wax) and from Steve Zoltan's single-nozzle jetting technology that never developed at Exxon with glass nozzles but became reality at Howtek later with Teflon molded nozzles and heated printheads in 1984. An ex-Howtek employee, Richard Helinski is credited for the patent using two materials to produce particle deposition articles in 3D using Howtek style inkjets and thermoplastic inks. These same Howtek inkjets and materials were used in the Ballistic Particle Manufacturing, Personal Modeler and the Visual Impact Corporation, Sculptor 3D printer businesses that have since closed and today at Solidscape, Inc. These printers and original Howtek style inkjets and materials can be seen at the 3D Inkjet Collection in New Hampshire, the only historical collection of Zoltan style inkjet news and 3D printers. Single nozzle jets are still in use today in Solidscape 3D printers and are considered to produce a very high quality models.

== Applications ==
- Soldering
- Precision parts or jewelry by investment casting or direct to metal using metallic powders with jetting bonding agents.
- Deposition of passive electronic components, which can be used for simple sensing such as gas, strain, humidity, temperature, touch, and more.
- Mechanical components and actuators.

Some inks must have high conductivity, high oxidation resistance and low sintering temperature while others are for other applications.

- Optical devices.

== Drop formation ==
Various drop formation technologies exist, and can be classified into two main types: continuous inkjet (CIJ) and drop-on-demand (DOD).

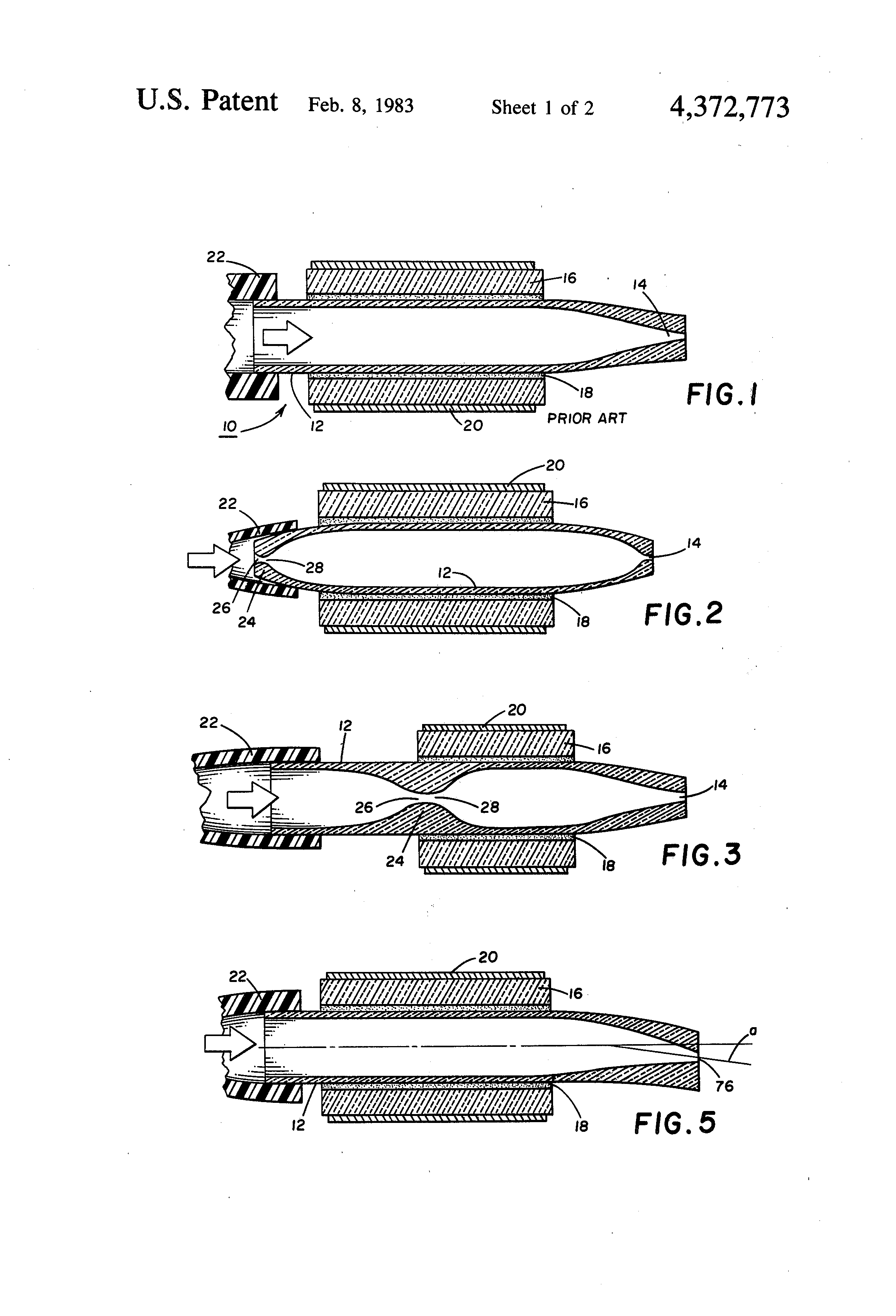
Laszlo Halasz in 1984

While CIJ has a straightforward drop creation and sophisticated drop trajectory manipulation, DOD has sophisticated drop creation and 'some' trajectory manipulation and alternate nozzle designs are possible. This single-nozzle inkjet technology is still in its early stages for those who want to investigate.

A Howtek inkjet nozzle uses a tubular thin wall piezo that produces a sound wave in the fluid chamber reflecting off both ends of the nozzle. The leading edge of a square wave signal triggers it and the lagging edge of the square wave signal in coincidence with the pressure wave expels the drop. This DOD single jet is acoustic. The 120C Tefzel nozzle is not rigid and does not squeeze. Drop formation is controlled by the fluid properties and nozzle geometry. Drive pulse amplitude and timing play a major role in drop volume and formation. Generally, DOD technology can be very complicated to understand and use.

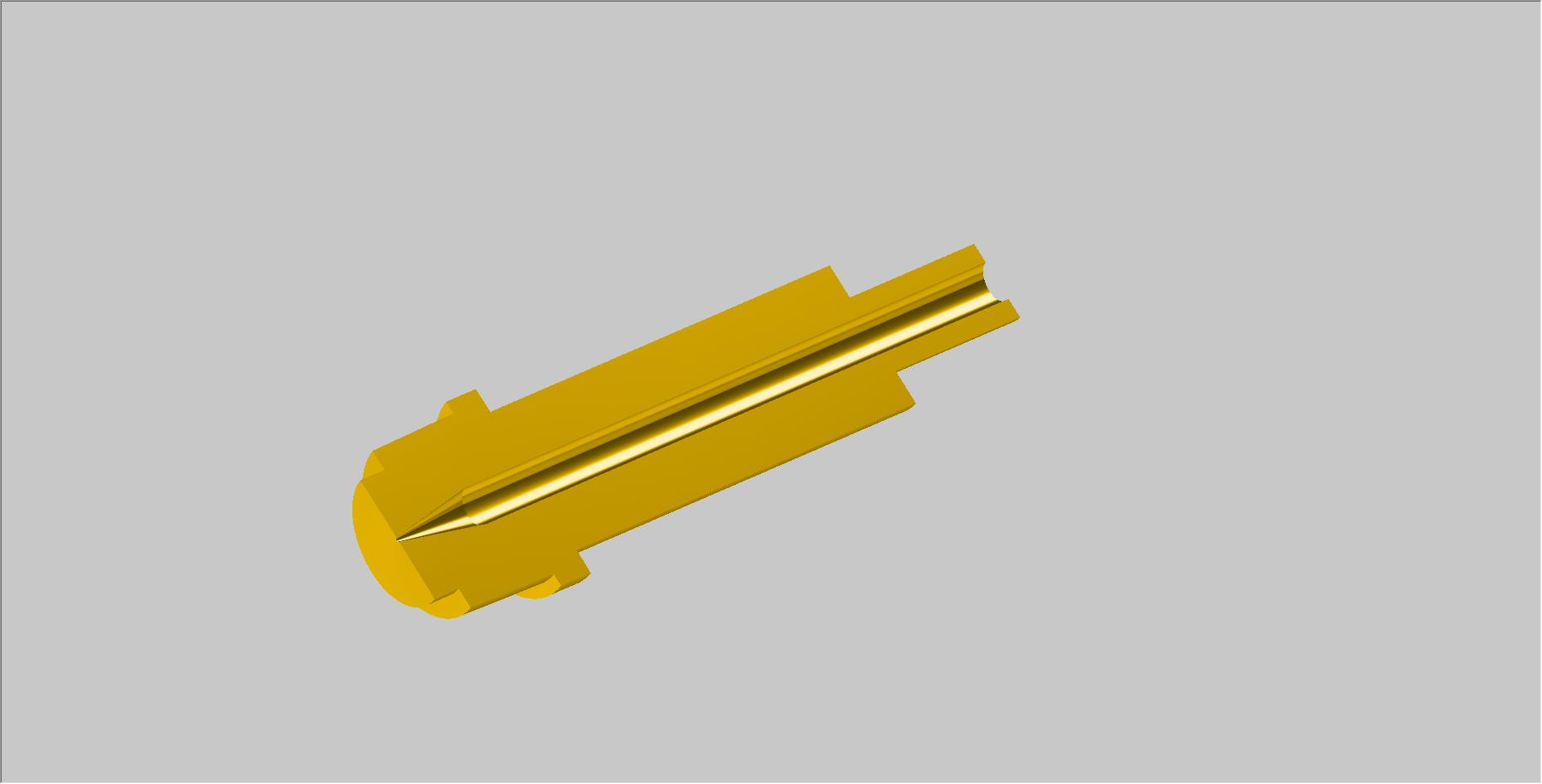
Representation of Howtek inkjet nozzle

Classification of inkjet technologies
Drop-on-demand (DOD)						Continuous (CIJ)			Electrospray
Thermal		Piezoelectric				Single jet	Multiple jet		
Face shooter	Side shooter	Shear	Extension	Unimorph/bimorph	Squeeze		Acoustic modulation	Thermal modulation	

=== Drop-on-demand (DOD) ===
In this method, drops of ink are released individually, on demand, by a voltage signal. Released drops either fall vertically without any trajectory manipulation or require special fire timing when projected horizontally from a rotary printhead spinning at 121 RPM to form characters (Howtek color printer 1986). Commercial printheads can have a single nozzle (Solidscape) or thousands of nozzles (HP) and many other variations in between. Arrayed Inkjet Apparatus (John G Martner patent 4468680, 1984 Exxon Research and Engineering Co) was invented after testing a Piezo DOD epoxied on the end of a piano wire 30 inches long and inserted into an ink fluid chamber leading to a nozzle. The tiny piezo either was pulling the wire in and out of the fluid chamber or transmitting a sound wave through the wire to impart acoustic energy into the fluid to fire a drop. The object of the invention was to build a printhead to reduce crosstalk (sound or any energy into closely placed nozzles for text printing).

The two leading technologies for forcing ink out of a nozzle on demand are thermal DOD and piezoelectric DOD. Notice the DOD may use a "Fill before firing a drop" or "Fire before fill" and Thermal DOD just "fires before fill". Drops must be precisely controlled with Piezo DOD or Thermal DOD. A standard Piezo DOD can fire drops at 9 feet per second drop velocity. Piezo DOD drop target positioning is very accurate with every drop fired horizontally or vertically.

Additional technologies include electrospray, acoustic discharge, electrostatic membrane and thermal bimorph.

==== Piezoelectric DOD ====
The voltage pulse applied to the piezo determines the jetted volume.

Piezoelectric Drop-On-Demand (DOD) was invented in the 1970s. One disadvantage of the piezoelectric-DOD method is that jettable inks must have viscosity and surface tension within a relatively strict range to expel smaller drops without spray or satellite drops. One big advantage is DOD piezoelectric jets can be designed to work with high temperature Thermoplastics and other hot-melt inks in the temperature range of 100-130C. This allows for three-dimensional droplets to be printed on substrates and makes investment casting and 3D modelling possible. The Richard Helinski 3D patent US5136515A started a new era in inkjet printing. Helinski's experience at Howtek, Inc from 1984 -1989 and his many other patents including subtractive color (layering colored drops) with suggestions from a fellow inventor/employee, Alan Hock, about investment casting encouraged this patent. The patent is focused on printing complex solid 3D objects printed with a clean burning material when placed in an investment casting process primarily in the jewelry industry but also favored by electronics, automotive and medical industries in the early 1990s. Howtek style inkjets and Thermoplastic materials were created to print documents and images and later Braille characters.

There are many patents and methods to expel drops with piezoelectric devices. A piezo changes shape when voltage is applied. The amount of dimensional change is extremely small. A Piezo also be made in many different sizes. The smaller the piezo the smaller the shape displacement. The use of a DOD piezo to print a text character (the size of these letters) requires the piezo to be placed side by side in a housing. Drops must be smaller than .005 inches and be placed precisely in lines to form letters. A Piezo placed side by side at frequencies high enough to print a full sheet of paper vibrate loudly and effect the drops nearby. Drop-On-Demand (DOD) printheads have manufacturing limits with single nozzles. Multi-jet DOD printing is most common with inkjet printers for this reason.

==== Thermal inkjet (TIJ) DOD ====
Comparison between piezoelectric jet (left) and thermal jet (right)

Thermal DOD was introduced in the 1980s by Canon and Hewlett-Packard. Thermal printing does not use high-temperature inks.

One disadvantage of this method is that the variety of inks compatible with TIJ is essentially limited, because this method is compatible with inks that have high vapour pressure, low boiling point and high kogation stability. Water's being such a solvent limited the popularity of this method for non-industrial photo printing only, where water-based inks are used.

In more recent years, thermal inkjet (TIJ) DOD systems have found renewed interest beyond consumer desktop printing, particularly in niche industrial and biomedical applications where their simplicity, small form factor, and integrated cartridge-style architecture offer advantages. For example, TIJ has been used for bio-printing and pharmaceutical deposition of small volumes of fluid in lab-on-chip devices. Despite the earlier limitation of ink chemistry compatibility, developments in fluid formulation and cartridge manufacturing have partly overcome these hurdles, allowing TIJ to handle a wider range of aqueous-based or low-viscosity solvents for specialised deployments.

=== Continuous inkjet (CIJ) ===
In this method, a stream of ink is released continuously from the nozzle. A garden hose jet stream is a good example of a continuous flow from a nozzle except CIJ nozzles are tiny (less than .005 inch or about 1/10 millimeter). The ink stream naturally breaks into separate drops due to Plateau–Rayleigh flow instability. Fluid streams can be broken into different size drops with vibration from a piezoelectric device. The use of a piezoelectric device should not be confused with Drop-On-Demand Inkjet which uses the piezo to generate sound waves in nozzles or expand the fluid chamber size to push single drops from a nozzle. The CIJ formed ink drops are either deflected by an electric field towards the desired location on the substrate or collected for reuse. CIJ printheads can be either have a single jet (nozzle) or multiple jets. CIJ is popular in industry and publishing but not typically seen in retail printers for home use.

One disadvantage of the CIJ method is the need for solvent monitoring. Since only a small fraction of the ink is being used for actual printing, solvent must be continually added to the recycled ink to compensate the evaporation that takes place during flight of the recycled drops.

Another disadvantage is the need for ink additives. Since this method is based on electrostatic deflection, ink additives, such as potassium thiocyanate, may deteriorate the performance of the printed devices.

CIJ can be directed through a magnetic field using low-temperature metal alloy ink as described in Johannes F Gottwald's Liquid Metal Recorder patent US3596285A, issued on July 27, 1971. The .003-inch aperture glass nozzle printed stock market quote symbols on a moving metal substrate belt and dropped on the table to be used as signage or reused in the recorder to print other symbols. This was possibly the earliest example of printing "fabricated objects" with an inkjet.

== Printhead ==
The printhead must have heating capability to print any material influenced by viscosity changes. Oil-based inks are sensitive to temperature. Waxes and hot-melt materials are solids at room temperature. Water-based inks may not need heat. It is also possible to print with metallic alloys such as lead, tin, indium, zinc and aluminum. The process of printing of low-melting point metals is called "direct melt printing" and was introduced in 1971 by Johannes F Gottwald patent, US3596285, "Liquid Metal Recording" with a Continuous inkjet (CIJ) long before any form of 3D Printing was ever considered. Thermoplastic DOD inkjets print at or above the piezoelectric Curie temperature and must be continuously poled to work. Piezo D33 displacement had to be optimized to lower drive voltages. See Piezo-response force microscopy for relevant theory. Prior research in 1980 by James McMahon about the six piezo physical poling states and tests to maximize piezo resonant and anti-resonant frequencies sped up the development time. Howtek manufactured these state of the art inkjets in 1985 before 3D printing with inkjets was invented on 8/4/1992.

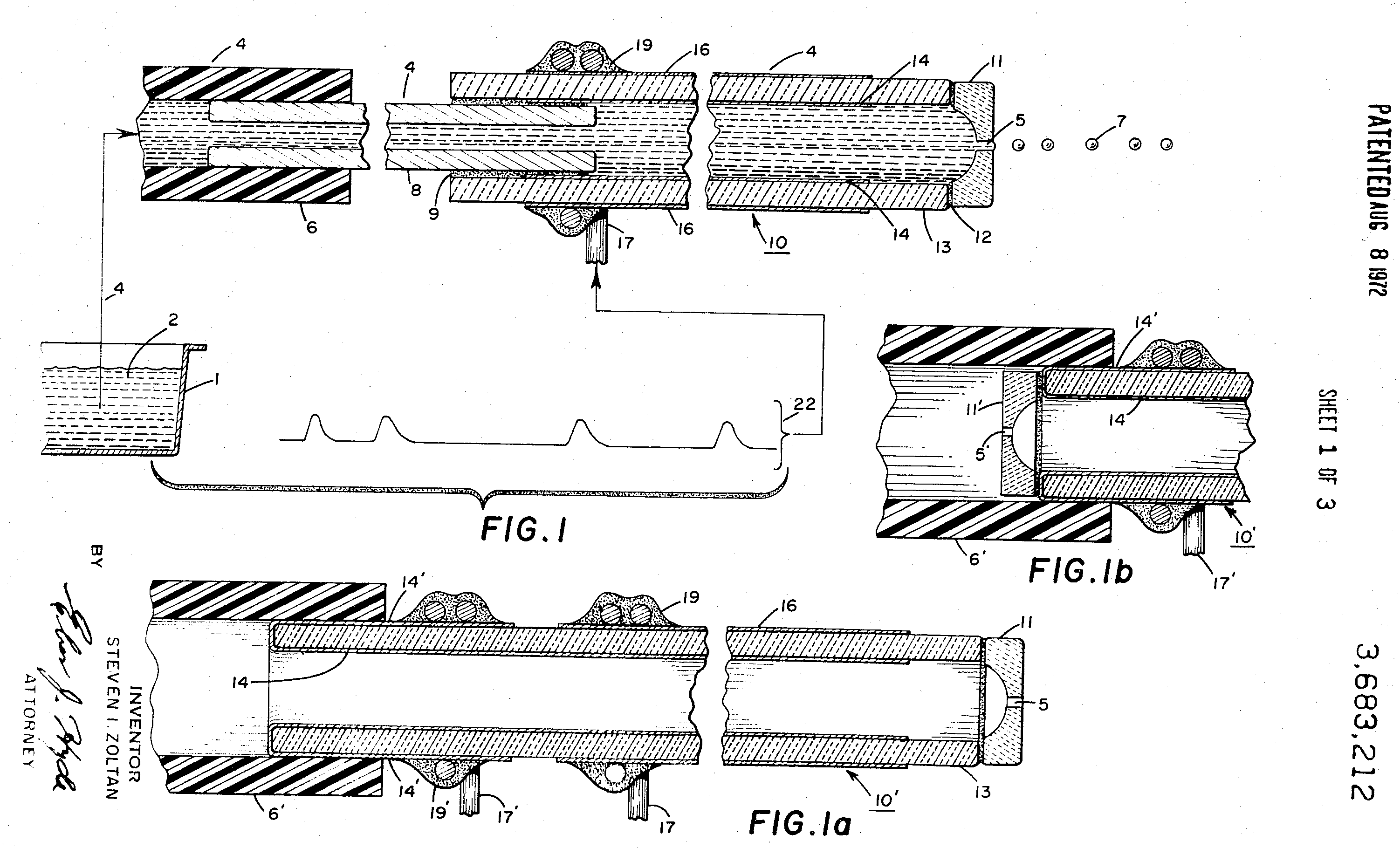
Zoltan inkjet nozzle

Original DOD inkjet printheads were made of glass in 1972 by Steve Zoltan. These early single nozzle inkjet printheads printed with water-based inks. Later a housing was needed to surround the inkjet with a stable thermal mass. Glass inkjet nozzles were hard to duplicate and the molded nozzles were introduced by Howtek, Inc. Howtek glass nozzles had to be made with heat by a torch and drawn glass tubes, then cut to size and polished to produce a flat nozzle orifice surface. Glass nozzle technology was better understood by one inventor, Laszlo Halasz in the 1980s and he could form different nozzle shapes by using heated oil to melt glass capillaries. Howtek introduced single-tubular Tefzel molded nozzles using a stainless steel core pin – blind molded and then sliced with a razor to expose the orifice in perfect shape. Howtek produced its own full-color thermoplastic- ink material printing letterhead sheets in the rotary-head Pixelmaster printer in 1986 with 32 single nozzles (eight for each primary color). The Tefzel nozzle material operating at 125C allowed only the voltage pulse energy to trigger an acoustical pressure wave in the fluid without coupling the high-frequency vibrations from the piezo that cause spray and fluid vibration as the drops are ejected. The ideas for the design came from a book discovered by Jim McMahon in 1972, Harry F Olson's Music, Physics and Engineering. Earlier inkjet designs with glass nozzles were also resonance sources and when packed with vibration dampening material could never eliminate spray. The object of the design was to have clean spray-free drops ejected over the frequency range of the nozzle length. The Howtek jets run nicely from 1 to 16,000 Hertz. No other company has produced printheads with this design to this day. The Tefzel nozzle with a long tapered front fluid chamber absorbed unwanted harmonics and allowed only the hydraulic fluid surge from the individual piezo drive pulse to eject a drop. One drive pulse equaled one drop at all frequencies up to the fluid resonance for the tube length. The square wave pulse leading edge triggered a sound wave in the fluid that reflected off the tail end of the nozzle tube and was reinforced when the lagging edge of the drive pulse was passing under the center of the piezo to boost the fluid pressure sufficiently to expel one single drop. The speed of sound for each of the two inks (wax and Thermoplastic) differs resulting in two maximum resonance frequencies for the same inkjet nozzle structure. Thus one Howtek printhead design works for two different inks. The Howtek inkjet nozzle is unique in so many ways. The design requires a strict assembly sequence and manufacturing process.

One 3D printer in use in 2021 (Solidscape) still has a Howtek style nozzle as it was manufactured in 1986. It originally had a hex-shaped metal nozzle-end structure with an offset-nozzle orifice that allowed the jet drops to be (aimed) directed toward a target to align properly for the best print quality when it was previously installed in the Howtek Pixelmaster. Over 1500 Howtek style inkjets were acquired by early Sanders Prototype, Inc when production of the Modelmaker 6 Pro was first started in 1994. The Modelmaker 6 pro uses two inkjets per machine. The inkjets are installed in a special printhead directing the drops straight downward for 3D printing. The original prototype 3D printer, the Sculptor by Visual Impact Corporation, using Howtek nozzles, printed horizontally in 1989. The Pixelmaster also projected the drops horizontally from a 121 rpm rotating printhead to print 2D characters or images on paper. A Braille character printer was introduced by Howtek and only sold a few machines in 1990–1991 with raised-font printed on plain paper using Howtek inkjets. This required four layers of drops to stack up for each Braille character. This was an early example of how three-dimensional (ink) material printing (not called 3D printing in 1984) got started and now-a-days Additive Manufacturing (AM) does not reference historical jetting of hot-melt material properties used in 3D printing. 3D printing (printing with raised surface inks) was inkjet printing in the 1960–1980s with wax, liquid metal and thermoplastic hot-melt fluids.

== Fabrication approaches ==
The printed material is rarely only one step in the process, which may include direct material deposition followed by a mechanical roller or a controlled surface milling step. It may be a deposition of a precursor followed by a catalyst, sintering, photonic curing, electroless plating etc., to give the final result. See Ballistic Particle Manufacturing(BPM)which uses a Solid ink single nozzle, heated to 125C and a 5 axis printing technique that required no other process for fabrication.

- Direct deposition is jetted material directly applied to a substrate or surface
- Mask printing
- Etching
- Inverse printing
- Powder bed

=== Additive inkjet fabrication ===
- The application of any jetted material having sufficient three-dimensional properties to achieve a Z axis dimension when printed over itself many times. It can include other fabrication steps as listed above under Fabrication approaches.

=== Subtractive inkjet fabrication ===
- The use of a milling step after deposition. Solidscape 3D inkjet printers use this technique in their model forming process. Layer thickness of 0.0005 inches require the 4 mil drops to be printed and the material spreading out but a milling step reduces the Z dimension to 0.0005 before the next layer is deposited. More than 50% of the material is removed on these thin layers but part excellent part quality is achieved with little stair stepping on the model sloped surfaces.

== Inkjet fluid materials ==
The ink must be liquid, but may also contain small solids if they do not cause clogging. The solid particles should be smaller than 1/10 of the nozzle diameter to avoid clogging and be smaller than 2 microns to reduce satellite drop spray. Fine detail inkjet printing has material filtered by 1 micron filters to prevent spray and fluid lines protected by 15 micron filters to prevent clogging.

Drop formation is governed by two main physical properties: surface tension and viscosity. The surface tension forms ejected drops into spheres, in accordance with Plateau–Rayleigh instability. The viscosity can be optimized at jet time by using an appropriate printhead temperature. Drop volume is controlled by drive pulse timing width and drive voltage amplitude. Each inkjet assembly will have a slight variation in drop size and maintaining all material and jet parameters is necessary for optimum performance. Drop formation and volume varies with drop frequency and jet orifice meniscus position. The liquid is positioned in the nozzle aperture by gravity (fluid storage tank must be slightly lower in height to the nozzle). The fluid surface tension also holds the fluid at the edge of the nozzle orifice (hole). The action of expelling a drop alters this natural steady fluid position condition. This condition is commonly called the meniscus of the fluid. The meniscus acts like a barrier and most be overcome to allow drop ejection. The meniscus also exerts strong forces when stretched. The lower the storage tank height the higher the force required to expel a drop. The meniscus spring action timing alters the drop size, drop velocity and drive voltage in drops formation. Firing drops more frequently means the characteristics of the drop change constantly because of meniscus position. Each jettable material has different physical properties and requires different printer parameters and tank height settings. Materials can not just be switched. The temperature of the inkjet must be more closely controlled to maintain surface tension and viscosity in a DOD system than in a CIJ system.

Generally, lower viscosity allows better droplet formation and in practice only liquids with viscosity of 2-50 mPa s can be printed. More precisely, liquids whose Ohnesorge number is larger than 0.1 and smaller than 1 are jettable.

- Metals:
  - Indium, tin, lead, zinc.
  - Gold, silver and copper can be printed if made into nanoparticle inks, which have lower sintering temperatures than in bulk, and can therefore be used with a larger range of temperature sensitive substrates.
  - Printing ascorbic acid followed by silver nitrate can be used for conductive traces.
- Ceramics:
  - Lead zirconate titanate (PZT)
  - Barium strontium titanite
  - Cerium oxide
  - Alumina (Al_{2}O_{3})
  - Silicon nitride (Si_{3}N_{4})
  - Titania (TiO_{2})
- Polymers:
  - PEDOT
  - PSS
  - PEDOT:PSS
- Biological materials
