= Diocotron instability =

Plasma instability created by two sheets of charge flowing past each other

A diocotron instability is a plasma instability created by two sheets of charge slipping past each other. Energy is dissipated in the form of two surface waves which propagate in opposite directions, one flowing over the other. This instability is the plasma analog of the Kelvin-Helmholtz instability in fluid mechanics.

Numerical simulation of a temporal Kelvin–Helmholtz instability
