= Dynamic instability =

Dynamic instability may refer to any of several scientific phenomena:

- Aircraft dynamic modes, including aircraft dynamic instability
- Atmospheric instability, in meteorology
- Dynamic instability of microtubules, in biology
- Firehose instability, in astrophysics
- Flutter, in aeroelasticity, a branch of mechanics
- Hydrodynamic instability, in fluid dynamics
- Speed wobble, in mechanical engineering
  - Others in Category:Fluid dynamic instabilities
