= Kelvin–Helmholtz instability =

Phenomenon of fluid mechanics

Numerical simulation of a temporal Kelvin–Helmholtz instability

The Kelvin–Helmholtz instability (after Lord Kelvin and Hermann von Helmholtz) is a fluid instability that occurs when there is velocity shear in a single continuous fluid or a velocity difference across the interface between two fluids. Kelvin-Helmholtz instabilities are visible in the atmospheres of planets and moons, such as in cloud formations on Earth or the Great Red Spot on Jupiter, and the atmosphere of the Sun.

Spatially developing 2D Kelvin-Helmholtz instability at low Reynolds number. Small perturbations, imposed at the inlet on the tangential velocity, evolve in the computational box. High Reynolds number would be marked with an increase of small scale motions.

== Theory overview and mathematical concepts ==
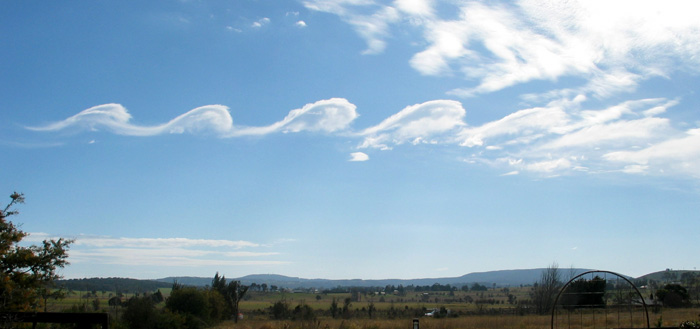
A KH instability rendered visible by clouds, known as fluctus, over Mount Duval in Australia

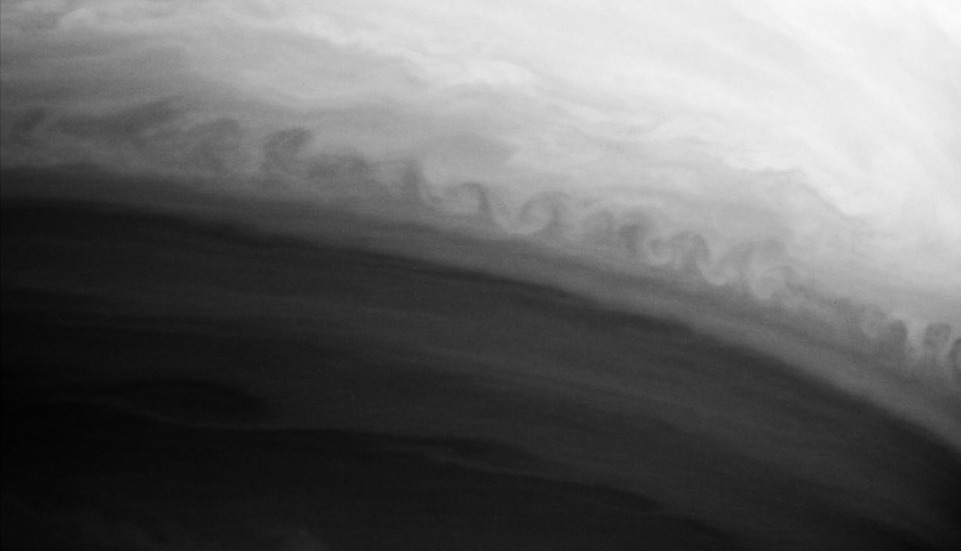
A KH instability on the planet Saturn, formed at the interaction of two bands of the planet's atmosphere

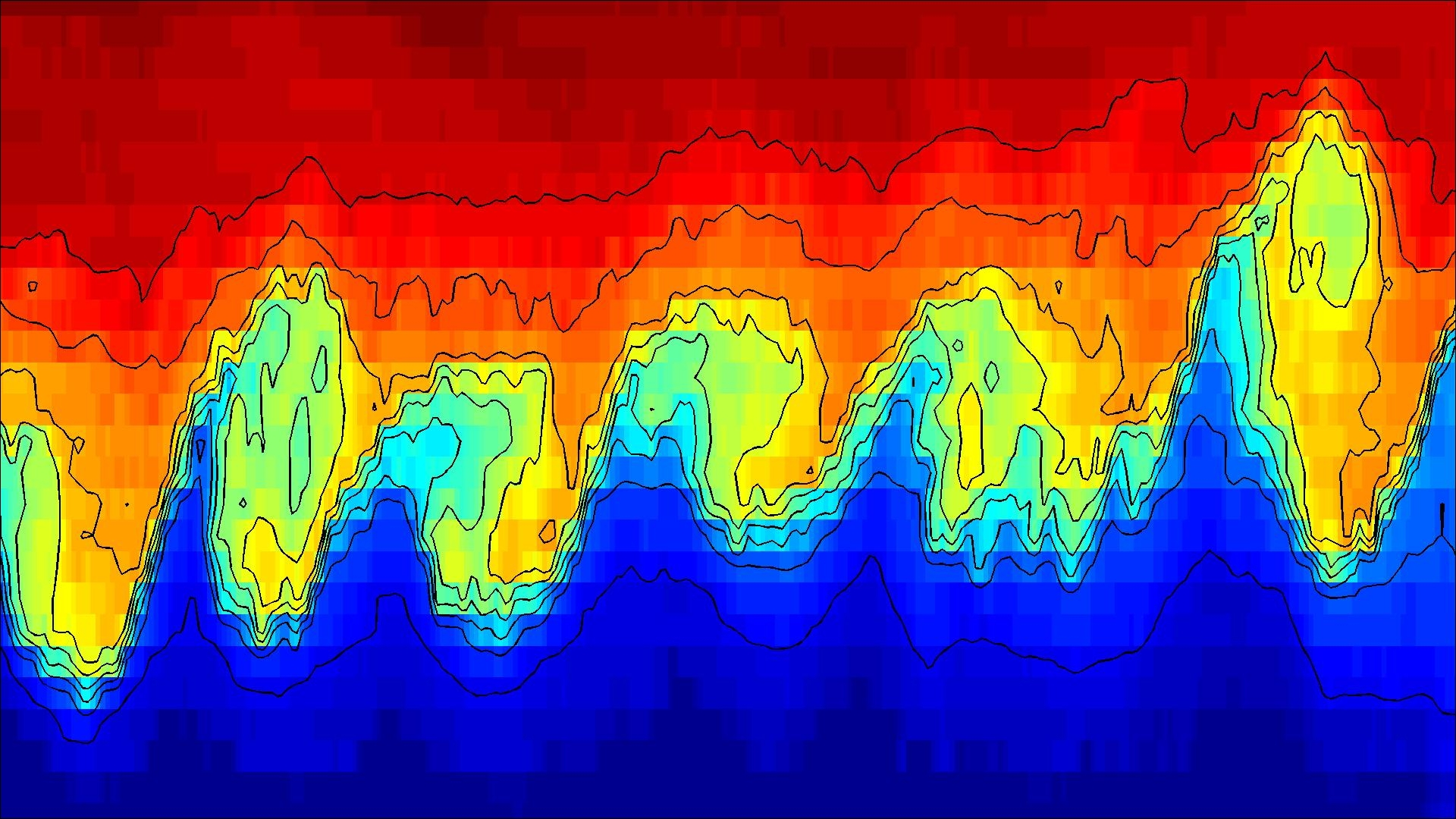
Kelvin-Helmholtz billows 500m deep in the Atlantic Ocean

Animation of the KH instability, using a second order 2D finite volume scheme

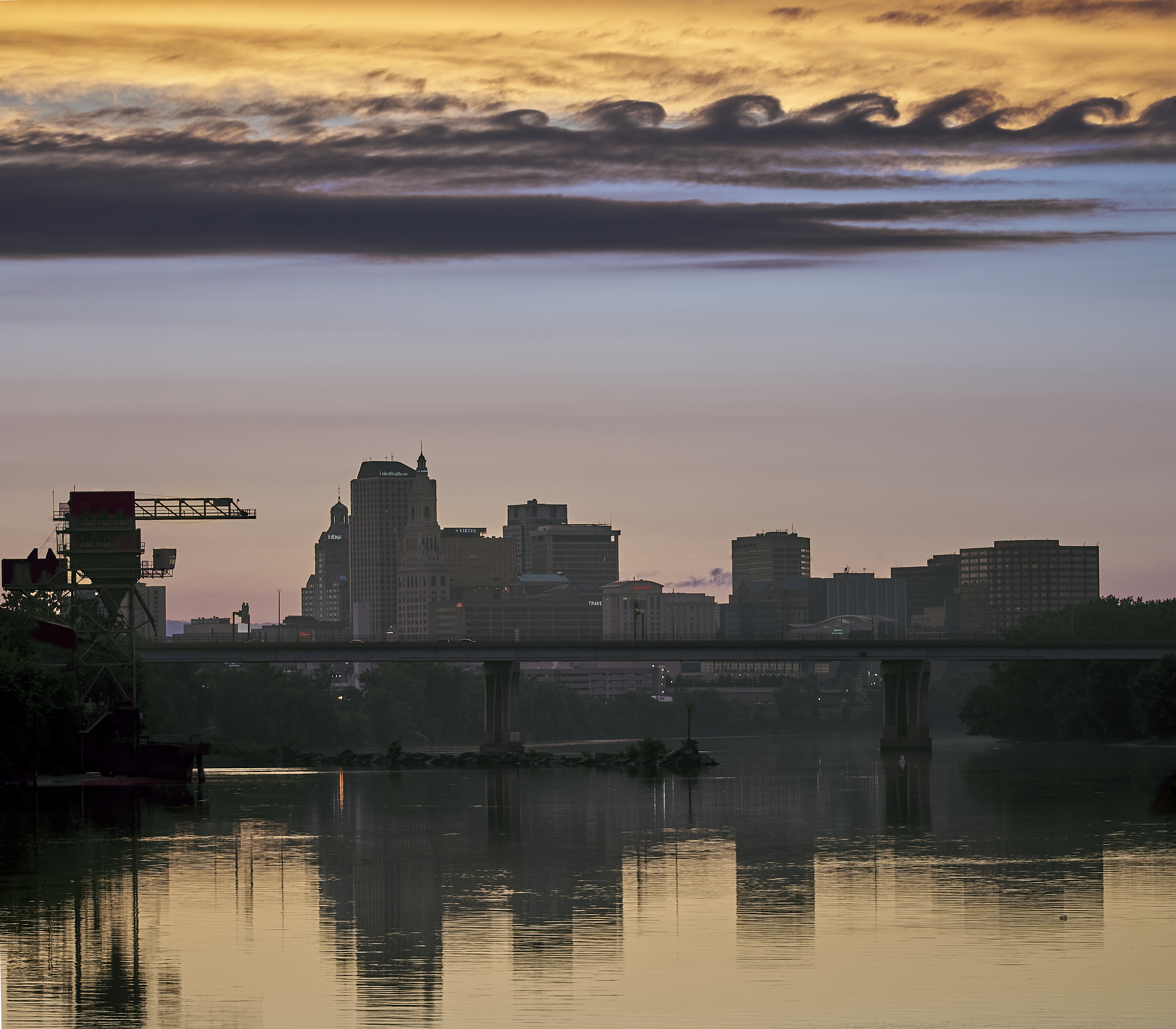
Kelvin-Helmholtz cloud formation over Hartford, Connecticut

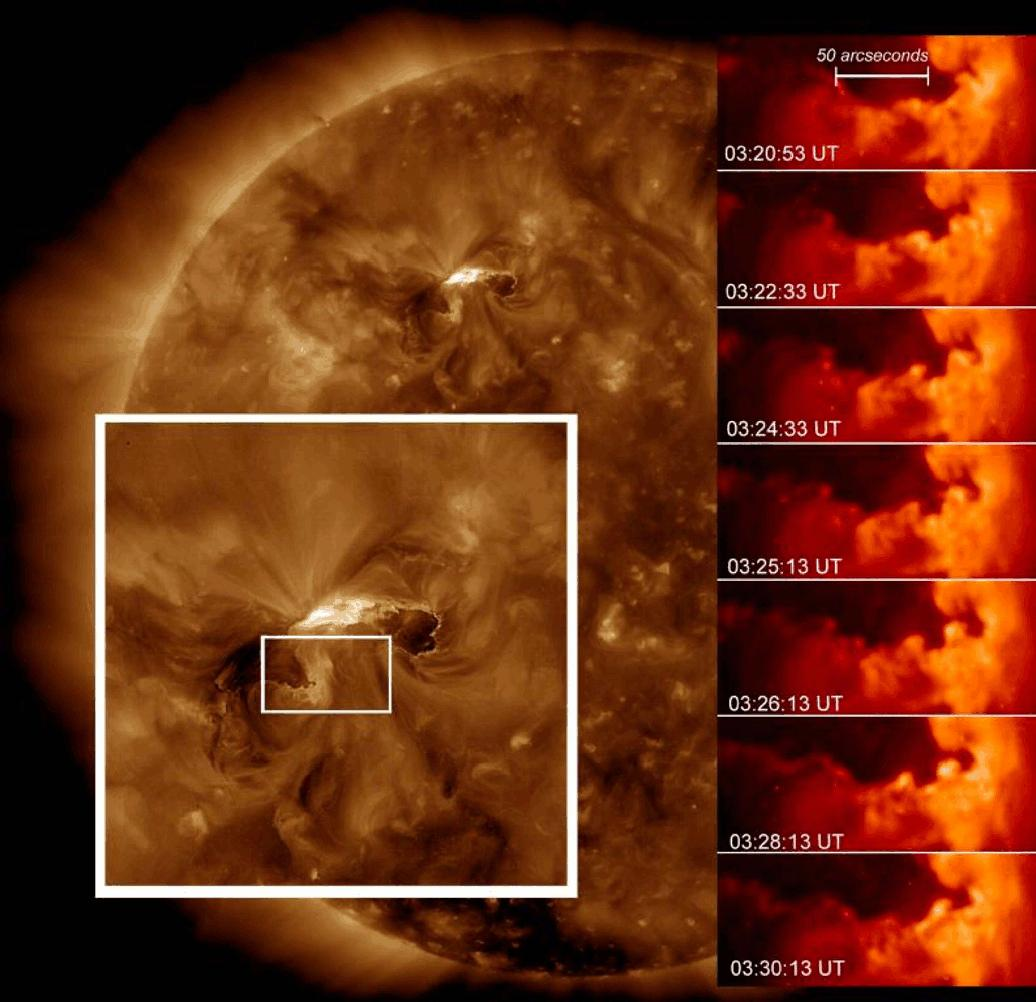
KH instability in the Sun's atmosphere, photographed on April 8, 2010.

Fluid dynamics predicts the onset of instability and transition to turbulent flow within fluids of different densities moving at different speeds. If surface tension is ignored, two fluids in parallel motion with different velocities and densities yield an interface that is unstable to short-wavelength perturbations for all speeds. However, surface tension is able to stabilize the short wavelength instability up to a threshold velocity.

Suppose we have two parallel plane streams of fluid of same density with speeds $U_1$ and $U_2$. Then the perturbed interface with the normal-mode decomposition $e^{i(kx-\omega t)}$ obeys the dispersion relation (for ideal flow with no surface tension),

$$\omega = k \frac{\rho_1 U_1 + \rho_2 U_2}{\rho_1+\rho_2} + i \frac{i\sqrt{\rho_1\rho_2}}{\rho_1+\rho_2}|U_1-U_2|$$.

If the density and velocity vary continuously in space (with the lighter layers uppermost, so that the fluid is RT-stable), the dynamics of the Kelvin-Helmholtz instability is described by the Taylor–Goldstein equation:
$$(U-c)^2\left({d^2\tilde\phi \over d z^2} - k^2\tilde\phi\right) +\left[N^2-(U-c){d^2 U \over d z^2}\right]\tilde\phi = 0,$$
where $N = \sqrt{g / L_\rho}$ denotes the Brunt–Väisälä frequency, U is the horizontal parallel velocity, k is the wave number, c is the eigenvalue parameter of the problem, $\tilde\phi$ is complex amplitude of the stream function. Its onset is given by the Richardson number $\mathrm{Ri}$. Typically the layer is unstable for $\mathrm{Ri} < 0.25$. These effects are common in cloud layers. The study of this instability is applicable in plasma physics, for example in inertial confinement fusion and the plasma–beryllium interface. In situations where there is a state of static stability (where there is a continuous density gradient), the Rayleigh–Taylor instability is often insignificant compared to the magnitude of the Kelvin–Helmholtz instability.

Numerically, the Kelvin–Helmholtz instability is simulated in a temporal or a spatial approach. In the temporal approach, the flow is considered in a periodic (cyclic) box "moving" at mean speed (absolute instability). In the spatial approach, simulations mimic a lab experiment with natural inlet and outlet conditions (convective instability).

== Discovery and history ==
The existence of the Kelvin-Helmholtz instability was first discovered by German physiologist and physicist Hermann von Helmholtz in 1868. Helmholtz identified that "every perfect geometrically sharp edge by which a fluid flows must tear it asunder and establish a surface of separation". Following that work, in 1871, collaborator William Thomson (later Lord Kelvin), developed a mathematical solution of linear instability whilst attempting to model the formation of ocean wind waves.

Throughout the early 20th Century, the ideas of Kelvin-Helmholtz instabilities were applied to a range of stratified fluid applications. In the early 1920s, Lewis Fry Richardson developed the concept that such shear instability would only form where shear overcame static stability due to stratification, encapsulated in the Richardson Number.

Geophysical observations of the Kelvin-Helmholtz instability were made through the late 1960s/early 1970s, for clouds, and later the ocean.

== Kelvin–Helmholtz instability in compressible flows: Landau stabilization ==
The Kelvin–Helmholtz instability in compressible flows was first studied by Lev Landau in 1944, and was later refined by Sergei Ivanovich Syrovatskii in 1954. Suppose $U_2=0$ and $U_1=U$ (which can always be achieved by a suitable choice of the frame of reference); then the dispersion relation for the normal mode $e^{i(k_xx+k_yy-\omega t)}$ is given by

$$\left[\frac{1}{\omega^2}-\frac{1}{(\omega-Uk_x)^2}\right]\left[\frac{1}{c^2k^2}-\frac{1}{\omega^2}-\frac{1}{(\omega-Uk_x)^2}\right]=0, \qquad k = \sqrt{k_x^2+k_y^2}$$,

where $c$ is the sound speed. The zero of the first factor is $\omega=\tfrac{1}{2}Uk_x$, which is always real. The zeros of the second factor are given by solving the bi-quadratic form in terms of $(\omega - \tfrac{1}{2}Uk_x)$:

$$\omega = \tfrac{1}{2}Uk_x \pm \sqrt{\frac{1}{4}U^2k_x^2 + c^2k^2 \pm c^2k^2\sqrt{1 + \frac{U^2k_x^2}{c^2k^2}}}.$$

These roots are real only if $Uk_x/ck>2\sqrt{2}\approx 2.83$, as shown elegantly by Landau. Let $\phi$ be the angle between the velocity flow $U\mathbf{e}_x$ and the wavevector $\mathbf{k}=k_x\mathbf{e}_x+k_y\mathbf{e}_y$. Since $k_x = k \cos\phi$, the instability condition can be rewritten as

$$M \cos\phi < 2\sqrt{2}, \quad M=\frac{U}{c};$$

here $M$ is the Mach number. The above condition yields two distinct physical regimes based on the Mach number of the flow:

- If the flow velocity is relatively low, specifically $M < 2\sqrt{2}$, the inequality holds for all angles, meaning the flow is unstable to perturbations propagating in any direction along the interface.
- If the flow is highly supersonic such that $M \ge 2\sqrt{2}$, the interface becomes completely stabilized against directional perturbations traveling within a forward cone where $\cos\phi \ge 2\sqrt{2}/M$; this is known as the Landau stabilization. In this supersonic regime, the instability only appears for oblique waves propagating at sufficiently large angles relative to the flow, satisfying $\cos\phi < 2\sqrt{2}/M.$

Landau in his original 1944 paper considered only the case where $\phi=0$ (i.e., $k_y=0$), leading to the prediction that the interface becomes completely stable at high supersonic speeds. However, Yakov Zeldovich subsequently conducted a laboratory experiment testing this phenomenon and found that the interface remains highly unstable and transitions into turbulence. Sergei I. Syrovatskii's 1954 generalization for arbitrary values of $\phi$ provided the missing mathematical framework, proving that oblique waves ($k_y \neq 0$) will always grow, thereby explaining the experimental instability observed by Zeldovich.

== See also ==
- Fluid dynamics
- Fluid mechanics
- Kármán vortex street
- Mushroom cloud
- Plateau–Rayleigh instability
- Rayleigh–Taylor instability
- Reynolds number
- Richtmyer–Meshkov instability
- Taylor–Couette flow
- Turbulence
