= Plateau–Rayleigh instability =

Fluid breakup of a falling stream

Three examples of droplet detachment for different fluids: (left) water, (center) glycerol, (right) a solution of PEG in water

In fluid dynamics, the Plateau–Rayleigh instability, often just called the Rayleigh instability, explains why and how a falling stream of fluid breaks up into smaller packets with the same total volume but less surface area per droplet. It is related to the Rayleigh–Taylor instability and is part of a greater branch of fluid dynamics concerned with fluid thread breakup. This fluid instability is exploited in the design of a particular type of ink jet technology whereby a jet of liquid is perturbed into a steady stream of droplets.

The driving force of the Plateau–Rayleigh instability is that liquids, by virtue of their surface tensions, tend to minimize their surface area. Work has been done in the 1990s on the final pinching profile by attacking it with self-similar solutions.

The instability is named for Joseph Plateau and Lord Rayleigh.

== History ==
The first to recognize the universal behaviour the break up of liquid jets into droplets and its wave behaviour was Félix Savart in 1833. Photography was not yet available, but he used stroboscopic light to study the phenomena. Joseph Plateau created an experimental set up (known as a Plateau tank) to study the formation of droplets in 1843 and identified the important role of surface tension in 1849. Gotthilf Hagen also studied the phenomena the same year but with reduced mathematical treatment. A debate on the nature of the phenomena started between Plateau and Hagen, whose letters where published in the Annalen der Physik.

In 1873, Plateau found experimentally that a vertically falling stream of water will break up into drops if its length is greater than about 3.13 to 3.18 times its diameter, which he noted is close to π. In 1879, John William Strutt, 3rd Baron Rayleigh used linear stability analysis to describe the instability. In 1891, Rayleigh also published photographies of the phenomena.

== Theory ==
Intermediate stage of a jet breaking into drops. Radii of curvature in the axial direction are shown. Equation for the radius of the stream is $R(z) = R_0 + A_k \cos(kz)$, where $R_0$ is the radius of the unperturbed stream, $A_k$ is the amplitude of the perturbation, $\scriptstyle z$ is distance along the axis of the stream, and $k$ is the wave number.

The explanation of this instability begins with the existence of tiny perturbations in the stream. These are always present, no matter how smooth the stream is (for example, in the liquid jet nozzle, there is vibration on the liquid stream due to a friction between the nozzle and the liquid stream). If the perturbations are resolved into sinusoidal components, we find that some components grow with time, while others decay with time. Among those that grow with time, some grow at faster rates than others. Whether a component decays or grows, and how fast it grows is entirely a function of its wave number (a measure of how many peaks and troughs per unit length) and the radius of the original cylindrical stream. The diagram to the right shows an exaggeration of a single component.

By assuming that all possible components exist initially in roughly equal (but minuscule) amplitudes, the size of the final drops can be predicted by determining by wave number which component grows the fastest. As time progresses, it is the component with the maximal growth rate that will come to dominate and will eventually be the one that pinches the stream into drops.

Although a thorough understanding of how this happens requires a mathematical development (see references), the diagram can provide a conceptual understanding. Observe the two bands shown girdling the stream—one at a peak and the other at a trough of the wave. At the trough, the radius of the stream is smaller, hence according to the Young–Laplace equation the pressure due to surface tension is increased. Likewise at the peak the radius of the stream is greater and, by the same reasoning, pressure due to surface tension is reduced. If this were the only effect, we would expect that the higher pressure in the trough would squeeze liquid into the lower-pressure region in the peak. In this way we see how the wave grows in amplitude over time.

But the Young–Laplace equation is influenced by two separate radius components. In this case one is the radius, already discussed, of the stream itself. The other is the radius of curvature of the wave itself. The fitted arcs in the diagram show these at a peak and at a trough. Observe that the radius of curvature at the trough is, in fact, negative, meaning that, according to Young–Laplace, it actually decreases the pressure in the trough. Likewise the radius of curvature at the peak is positive and increases the pressure in that region. The effect of these components is opposite the effects of the radius of the stream itself.

The two effects, in general, do not exactly cancel. One of them will have greater magnitude than the other, depending upon wave number and the initial radius of the stream. When the wave number is such that the radius of curvature of the wave dominates that of the radius of the stream, such components will decay over time. When the effect of the radius of the stream dominates that of the curvature of the wave, such components grow exponentially with time.

=== Linear stability analysis ===
By decomposing an arbitrary disturbance on the free surface into its constitutive harmonics/wavelengths one can derive a condition for the stability of the jet in terms of the perturbation:

$$\omega^2 = \frac{\sigma k}{\rho a^2} \frac{I_1(ka)}{I_0(ka)} \left ( 1 - k^2 a^2 \right ),$$

where ω is the growth rate of the perturbation, σ is the surface tension of the fluids, k is the wavenumber of perturbation, ρ is the fluid density, a is the initial radius of the unperturbed fluid, and I_{n} is the n-th modified Bessel function of the first kind. By computing the growth rate as a function of wavenumber, one can determine that the fastest growing disturbance wavelength occurs at:

$$\lambda_\text{max} \approx 9.02a.$$

The wavelength of maximum instability increases as the radius of the fluid thread increases.

It is found that unstable components (that is, components that grow over time) are only those where the product of the wave number with the initial radius is less than unity ($ka < 1$). The component that grows the fastest is the one whose wave number satisfies the equation

$$ka \simeq 0.697.$$

== Examples ==
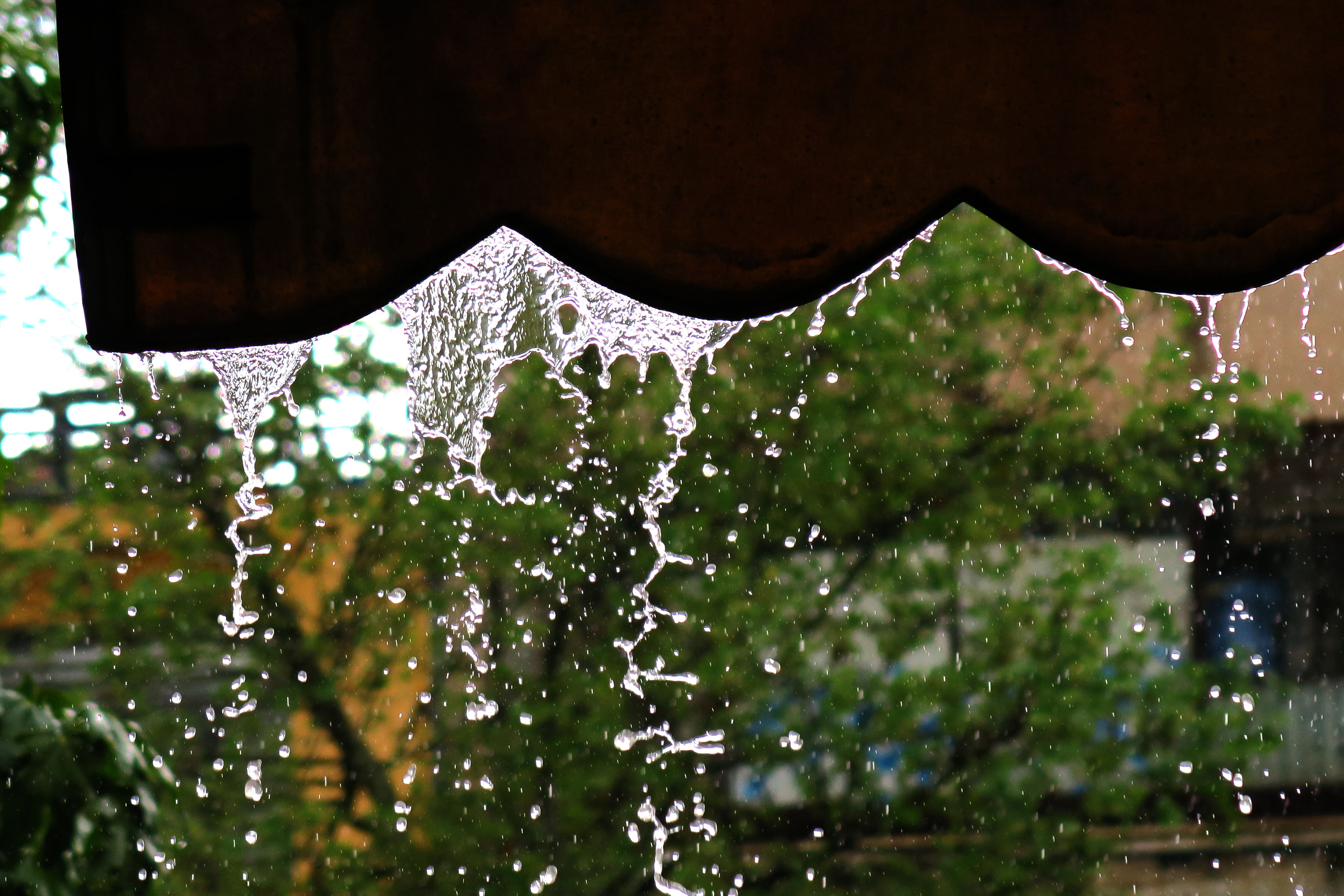
Rain water flux from a canopy. Among the forces that govern drop formation: Plateau–Rayleigh instability, surface tension, cohesion, Van der Waals force.

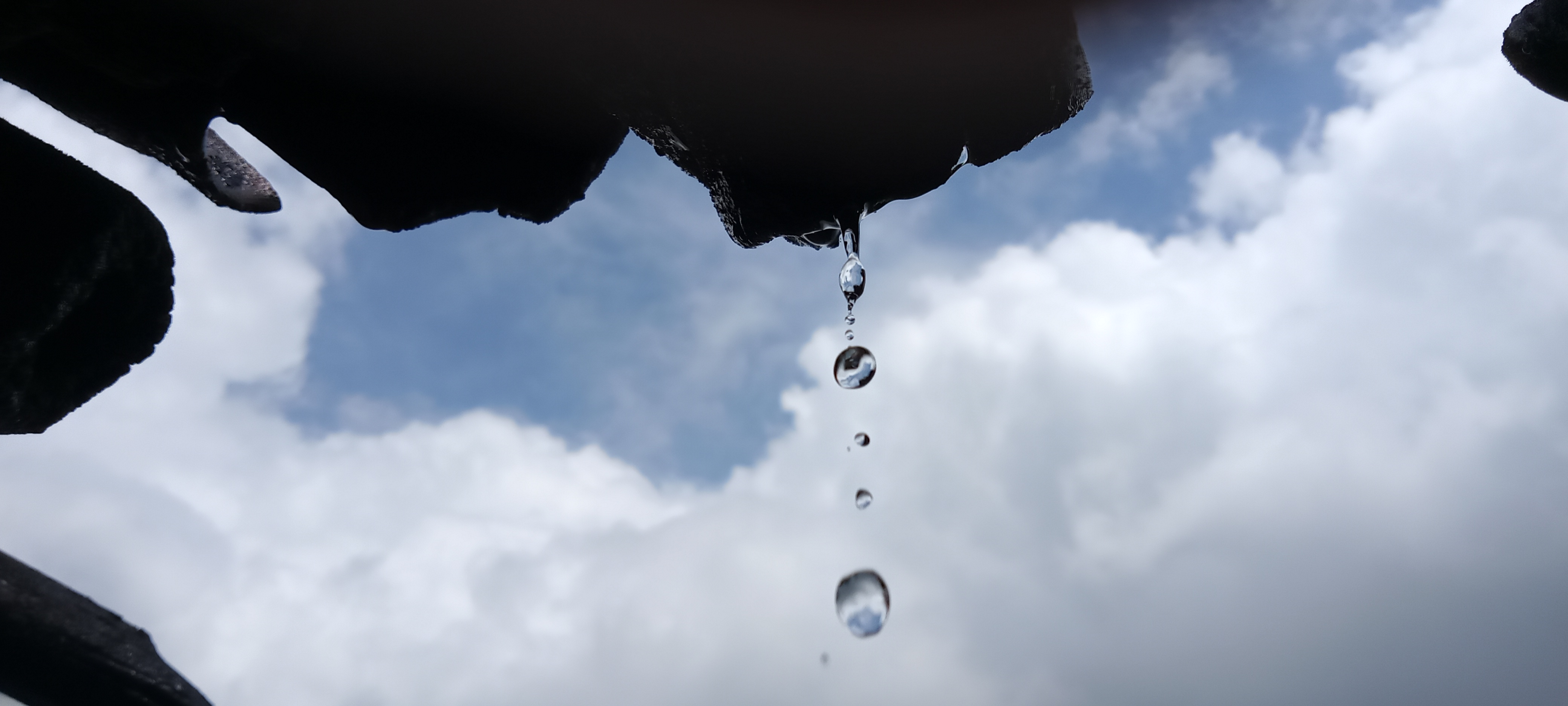
Rain water dripping from a rooftop

=== Water dripping from a faucet/tap ===
Water dropping from a tap

A special case of this is the formation of small droplets when water is dripping from a faucet/tap. When a segment of water begins to separate from the faucet, a neck is formed and then stretched. If the diameter of the faucet is big enough, the neck does not get sucked back in, and it undergoes a Plateau–Rayleigh instability and collapses into a small droplet.

=== Urination ===
Another everyday example of Plateau–Rayleigh instability occurs in urination, particularly standing male urination. The stream of urine experiences instability after about 15 cm (6 inches), breaking into droplets, which causes significant splash-back on impacting a surface. By contrast, if the stream contacts a surface while still in a stable state – such as by urinating directly against a urinal or wall – splash-back is almost eliminated.

=== Inkjet printing ===
Continuous inkjet printers (as opposed to drop-on-demand inkjet printers) generate a cylindrical stream of ink that breaks up into droplets prior to staining printer paper. By adjusting the size of the droplets using tunable temperature or pressure perturbations and imparting electrical charge to the ink, inkjet printers then steer the stream of droplets using electrostatics to form specific patterns on printer paper
