= Miles-Phillips mechanism =

Generation of wind waves

In physical oceanography and fluid mechanics, the Miles-Phillips mechanism describes the generation of wind waves from a flat sea surface by two distinct mechanisms. Wind blowing over the surface generates tiny wavelets. These wavelets develop over time and become ocean surface waves by absorbing the energy transferred from the wind. The Miles-Phillips mechanism is a physical interpretation of these wind-generated surface waves.
Both mechanisms are applied to gravity-capillary waves and have in common that waves are generated by a resonance phenomenon. The Miles mechanism is based on the hypothesis that waves arise as an instability of the sea-atmosphere system. The Phillips mechanism assumes that turbulent eddies in the atmospheric boundary layer induce pressure fluctuations at the sea surface. The Phillips mechanism is generally assumed to be important in the first stages of wave growth, whereas the Miles mechanism is important in later stages where the wave growth becomes exponential in time.

== History ==
It was Harold Jeffreys in 1925 who was the first to produce a plausible explanation for the phase shift between the water surface and the atmospheric pressure which can give rise to an energy flux between the air and the water. For the waves to grow, a higher pressure on the windward side of the wave, in comparison to the leeward side, is necessary to create a positive energy flux. Using dimensional analysis, Jeffreys showed that the atmospheric pressure can be displayed as
$$p = S \rho_a (U_{\infty} - C)^2 \frac{\partial \eta}{\partial x}$$

where $S$ is the constant of proportionality, also termed sheltering coefficient, $\rho_a$ is the density of the atmosphere, $U_{\infty}$ is the wind speed, $C$ is the phase speed of the wave and $\eta$ is the free surface elevation. The subscript $\infty$ is used to make the distinction that no boundary layer is considered in this theory. Expanding this pressure term to the energy transfer yields
$$\frac{\partial E}{\partial t} = \frac{1}{2\rho_w g} S \rho_a (U_{\infty} - C)^2 (ak)^2 C$$

where $\rho_w$ is the density of the water, $g$ is the gravitational acceleration, $a$ is the wave amplitude and $k$ is the wavenumber. With this theory, Jeffreys calculated the sheltering coefficient at a value of 0.3 based on observations of wind speeds.

In 1956, Fritz Ursell examined available data on pressure variation in wind tunnels from multiple sources and concluded that the value of $S$ found by Jeffreys was too large. This result led Ursell to reject the theory from Jeffreys.
Ursell's work also resulted in new advances in the search for a plausible mechanism for wind-generated waves. These advances led a year later to two new theoretical concepts: the Miles and Phillips mechanisms.

== Miles' Theory ==
John W. Miles developed his theory in 1957 for inviscid, incompressible air and water. He assumed that air can be expressed as a mean shear flow with varying height above the surface. By solving the hydrodynamic equations for the coupled sea-atmosphere system, Miles was able to express the free surface elevation as a function of wave parameters and sea-atmosphere characteristics as
$$\eta = a \exp\left[\frac{1}{2} \varepsilon \beta k C_w \left(\frac{U}{C_w}\right)^2 t \right] \exp[i(kx - \omega t)]$$

where $\varepsilon = (\rho_a / \rho_w)$, $\beta$ is the scale parameter, $C_w$ is the phase speed of free gravity waves, $U$ is the wind speed and $\omega$ is the angular frequency of the wave. The wind speed as a function of height was found by integrating the Orr-Sommerfeld equation with the assumption of a logarithmic boundary layer and that in the equilibrium state no currents below the sea surface exist
$$U(z) = \frac{u_*}{\kappa} \log\left(1 + \frac{z}{z_0}\right)$$
where $\kappa$ is the von Kármán's constant, $u_* = (\tau/\rho_a)^{1/2}$ is the friction velocity, $\tau$ is the Reynolds stress and $z_0$ is the roughness length. Furthermore, Miles defined the growth rate $\gamma$ of the wave energy for arbitrary angles $\phi$ between the wind and the waves as
$$\gamma = \varepsilon \beta \omega \left(\frac{U}{C_w} \cos\phi\right)^2$$
Miles determined $\gamma$ in his 1957 paper by solving the inviscid form of the Orr-Sommerfeld equation. He further expanded his theory on the growth rate of wind driven waves by finding an expression for the dimensionless growth rate $\gamma / \varepsilon f$ at a critical height $z_c$ above the surface where the wind speed $U$ is equal is to the phase speed of the gravity waves $C_w$.
$$\frac{\gamma}{\varepsilon f} = -\frac{\pi}{2k}|\chi|^2 \frac{\left(\frac{\partial^2 U}{\partial z^2}\right)_{z=z_c}}{\left(\frac{\partial U}{\partial z}\right)_{z=z_c}}$$
with $f$ the frequency of the wave and $\chi$ the amplitude of the vertical velocity field at the critical height $z_c$. The first derivative $U'(z)$ describes the shear of the wind velocity field and the second derivative $U''(z)$ described the curvature of the wind velocity field. This result represents Miles' classical result for the growth of surface waves. It becomes clear that without wind shear in the atmosphere ($U'(z) = 0$), the result from Miles fails, hence the name 'shear instability mechanism'.

Even though this theory gives an accurate description of the transfer of energy from the wind to the waves, it also has some limitations

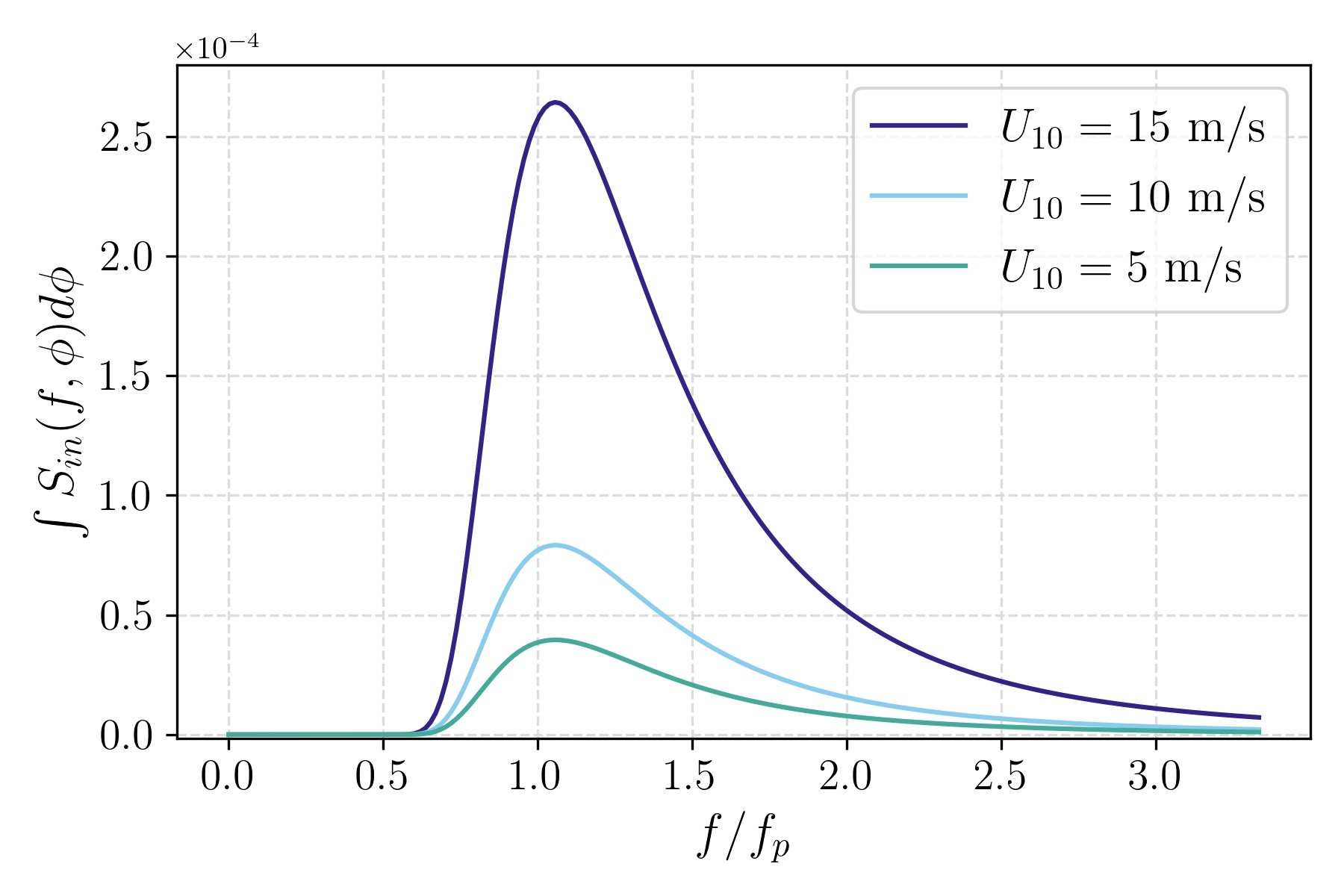
Atmospheric input term $S_{in}(f, \phi)$ for Miles' Theory integrated over all angles $\phi$ as a function of the frequency $f$ divided by the frequency of spectral peak $f_p$. The term has been evaluated for wind speeds of 5, 10 and 15 m/s. The parameters for the JONSWAP spectrum are: JONSWAP parameter $\alpha$ = 0.01, spectral peak frequency $f_p$ = 0.3 Hz, peak width parameter $\sigma$ = 0.08 and peak enhancement factor $\beta^r$ = 3.3.

- Miles considered the case of inviscid air and water, which means that viscous effects are neglected in this case.
- The effects that waves have on the atmospheric boundary layer are not taken into account.
- Only the case of linear effects are examined with this theory.
- Miles theory predicts growth of waves for all wind speeds, observations show however that there exists a minimum wind speed of 0.23 m/s before growth occurs.

The atmospheric energy input from the wind to the waves is represented by $S_{in}$. Snyder and Cox (1967) were the first to produce a relationship for the experimental growth rate due to atmospheric forcing by use of experimental data. They found
$$S_{in}(f,\phi) = \varepsilon \beta \omega \left(\frac{U_{10}}{C}\cos\phi-1\right)^2 F(f,\phi)$$
where $U_{10}$ the wind speed measured at a height of 10 meters and $F(f,\phi)$ a spectrum of the form of the JONSWAP. The JONSWAP spectrum is a spectrum based on data collected during the Joint North Sea Wave Observation Project and is a variation on the Pierson-Moskowitz spectrum, but then multiplied by an extra peak enhancement factor $\beta^r$
$$F(f) = \alpha g^2 (2\pi)^{-4} f^{-5}\exp\left[{-\frac{5}{4}\left(\frac{f}{f_p}\right)^{-4}}\right]\cdot \beta^{\exp\left[\frac{-(f-f_p)^2}{2\sigma^2 f_p^2}\right]}$$

== Phillips' Theory ==
At the same time, but independently from Miles, Owen M. Phillips (1957) developed his theory for the generation of waves based on the resonance between a fluctuating pressure field and surface waves. The main idea behind Phillips' theory is that this resonance mechanism causes the waves to grow when the length of the waves matches the length of the atmospheric pressure fluctuations. This means that the energy will be transferred to the components in the spectrum which satisfy the resonance condition.
Phillips determined the atmospheric source term for his theory as the following
$$S_{in}(f,\phi)=\frac{2\pi^2\omega}{\rho_w^2 C^3 C_g} \Pi(\mathbf{k},\omega)$$
where $\Pi(\mathbf{k},\omega)$ is the frequency spectrum, with the three dimensional wave number $\mathbf{k}$.

The strong points from this theory are that waves can grow from an initially smooth surface, so the initial presence of surface waves is not necessary. In addition, contrary to Miles' theory, this theory does predict that no wave growth can occur if the wind speed is below a certain value.
Miles theory predicts exponential growth of waves with time, while Phillips theory predicts linear growth with time. The linear growth of the wave is especially observed in the earliest stages of wave growth. For later stages, Miles' exponential growth is more consistent with observations.

== See also ==
- Gravity waves
- Wind waves
- Wind stress
- Swell
