= Swell (wave) =

Series of waves generated by distant weather systems

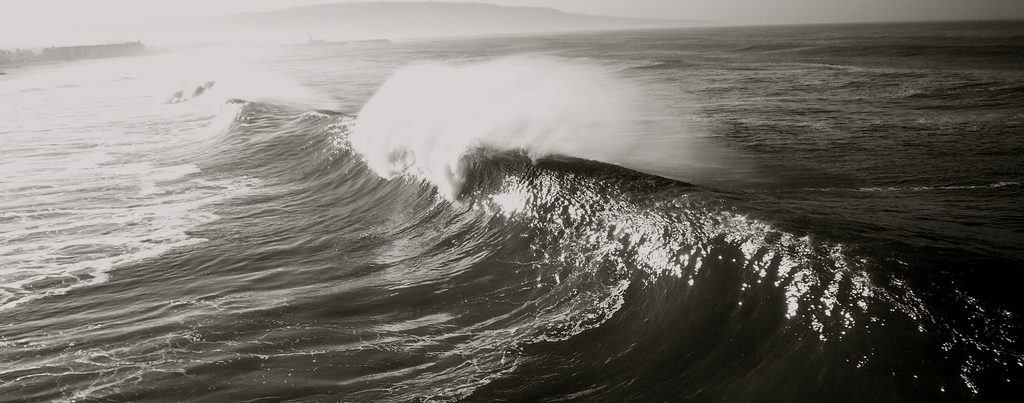
Breaking swell waves at Hermosa Beach, California

A swell, also sometimes referred to as ground swell, in the context of an ocean, sea or lake, is a series of mechanical waves that propagate along the interface between water and air under the predominating influence of gravity, and thus are often referred to as surface gravity waves. These surface gravity waves have their origin as wind waves, but are the consequence of dispersion of wind waves from distant weather systems, where wind blows for a duration of time over a fetch of water, and these waves move out from the source area at speeds that are a function of wave period and length. More generally, a swell consists of wind-generated waves that are not greatly affected by the local wind at that time. Swell waves often have a relatively long wavelength, as short wavelength waves carry less energy and dissipate faster, but this varies due to the size, strength, and duration of the weather system responsible for the swell and the size of the water body, and varies from event to event, and from the same event, over time. Occasionally, swells that are longer than 700 m occur as a result of the most severe storms.

Swell direction is the direction from which the swell is moving. It is given as a geographical direction, either in degrees, or in points of the compass, such as NNW or SW swell, and like winds, the direction given is generally the direction the swell is coming from. Swells have a narrower range of frequencies and directions than locally generated wind waves, because they have dispersed from their generation area and over time tend to sort by speed of propagation with the faster waves passing a distant point first. Swells take on a more defined shape and direction and are less random than locally generated wind waves.

== Formation ==
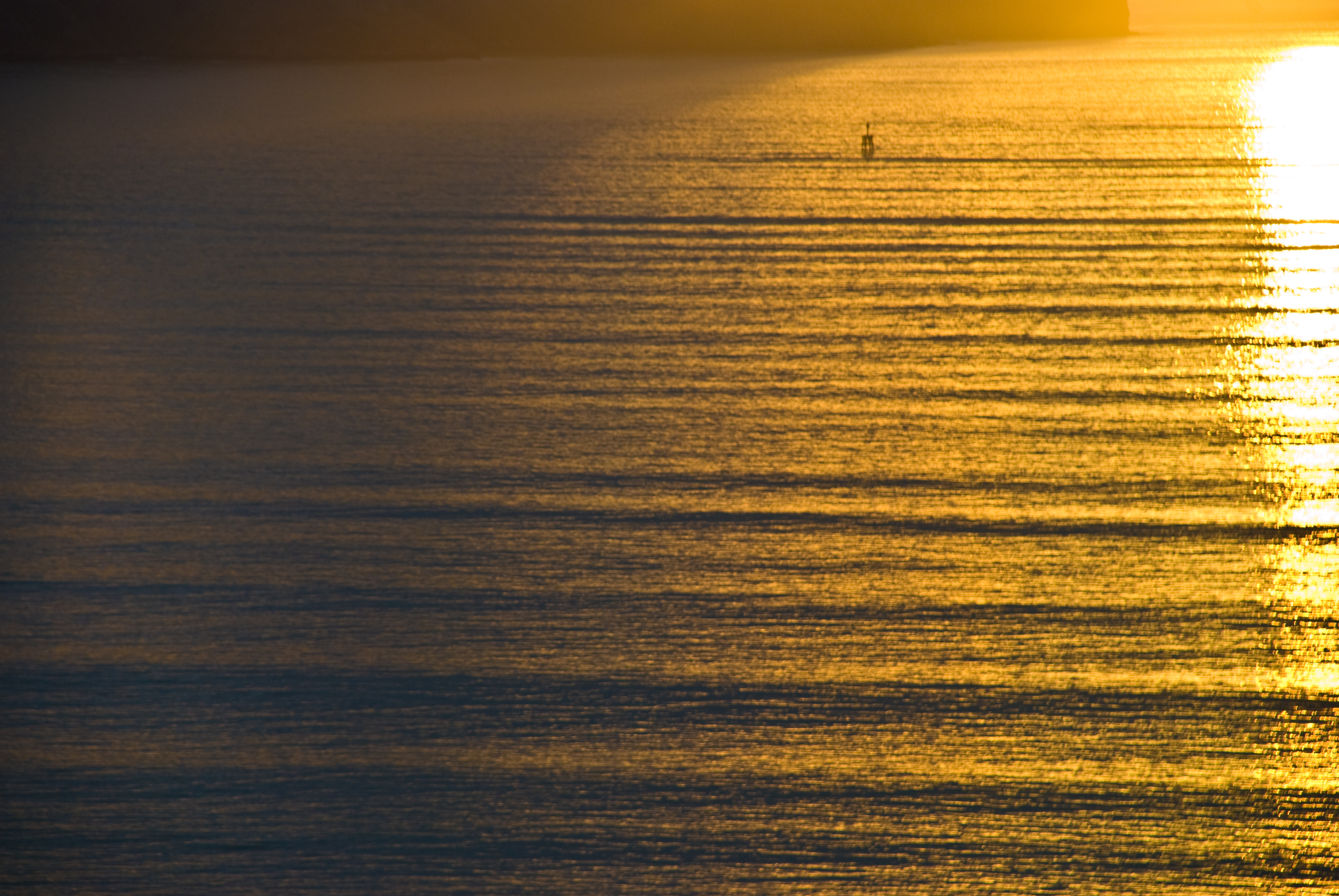
Swell near Lyttelton Harbour, New Zealand

Large breakers observed on a shore may result from distant weather systems over the ocean. Five factors work together to determine the size of wind waves which will become ocean swell:

- Wind speed – the wind must be moving faster than the wave crest (in the direction in which the wave crest travels) for net energy transfer from air to water; stronger prolonged winds create larger waves
- The uninterrupted distance of open water over which the wind blows without significant change in direction (called the fetch)
- Width of water surface in the fetch
- Wind duration – the time over which the wind has blown over the fetch
- Water depth

A wave is described using the following dimensions:

- Wave height (from trough to crest)
- Wavelength (from crest to crest)
- Wave period (time interval between arrival of consecutive crests at a stationary point)
- Wave propagation direction

Wavelength is a function of period, and of water depth for depths less than approximately half the wavelength, where the wave motion is affected by friction with the bottom.

Effects of deepwater wave on movement of water particles (Stokes drift).

A fully developed sea has the maximum wave size theoretically possible for a wind of a specific strength and fetch. Further exposure to that specific wind would result in a loss of energy equal to the energy input giving a steady state, due to the energy dissipation from viscosity and breaking of wave tops as "whitecaps".

Waves in a given area typically have a range of heights. For weather reporting and for scientific analysis of wind wave statistics, their characteristic height over a time interval is usually expressed as significant wave height. This figure represents an average height of the highest one-third of the waves in a given time period (usually chosen somewhere in the range from 20 minutes to twelve hours), or in a specific wave or storm system. The significant wave height is also the value a "trained observer" (e.g. from a ship's crew) would estimate from visual observation of a sea state. Given the variability of wave height, the largest individual waves are likely to be somewhat less than twice the significant wave height.

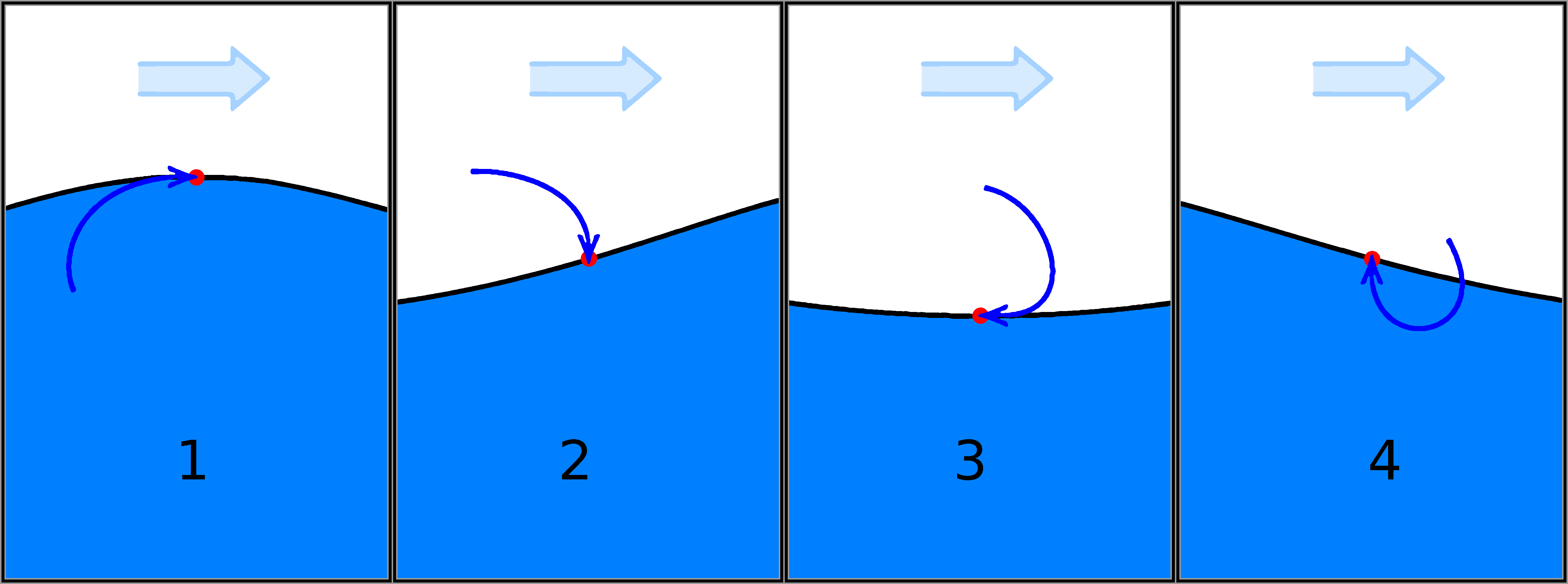
The phases of an ocean surface wave: 1. Wave Crest, where the water masses of the surface layer are moving horizontally in the same direction as the propagating wavefront. 2. Falling wave. 3. Trough, where the water masses of the surface layer are moving horizontally in the opposite direction of the wavefront direction. 4. Rising wave.

=== Sources of wind-wave generation ===
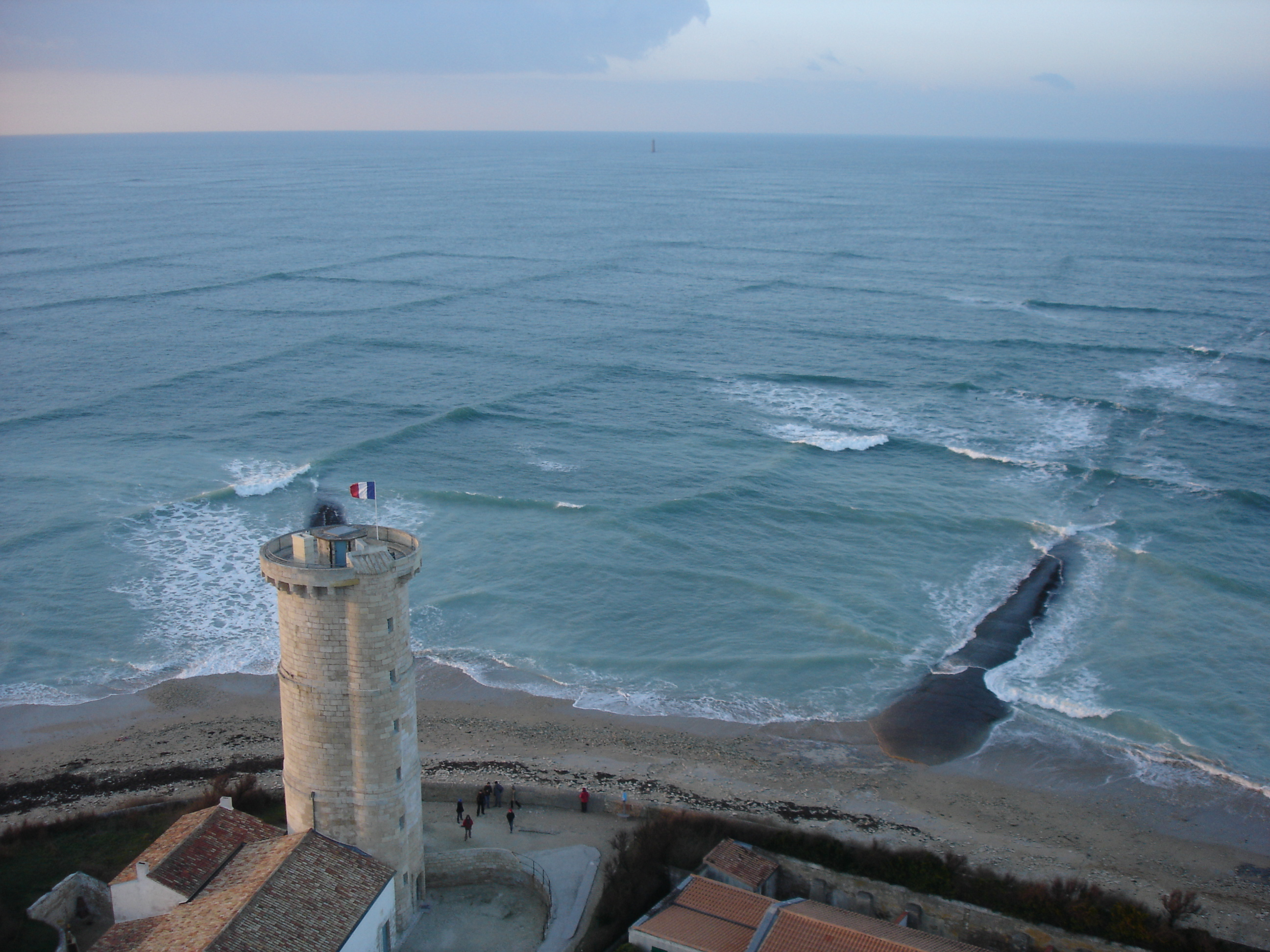
Cross sea of shallow-water swell waves near the Whales Lighthouse (Phare des Baleines), Île de Ré

Wind waves are generated by wind. Other kinds of disturbances such as seismic events, can also cause gravity waves, but they are not wind waves, and do not generally result in swell. The generation of wind waves is initiated by the disturbances of the crosswind field on the surface of the water.

For initial conditions of a flat water surface (Beaufort Scale 0) and abrupt crosswind flows on the surface of the water, the generation of surface wind waves can be explained by two mechanisms, which are initiated by normal pressure fluctuations of turbulent winds and parallel wind shear flows.

=== Surface wave generation by winds ===
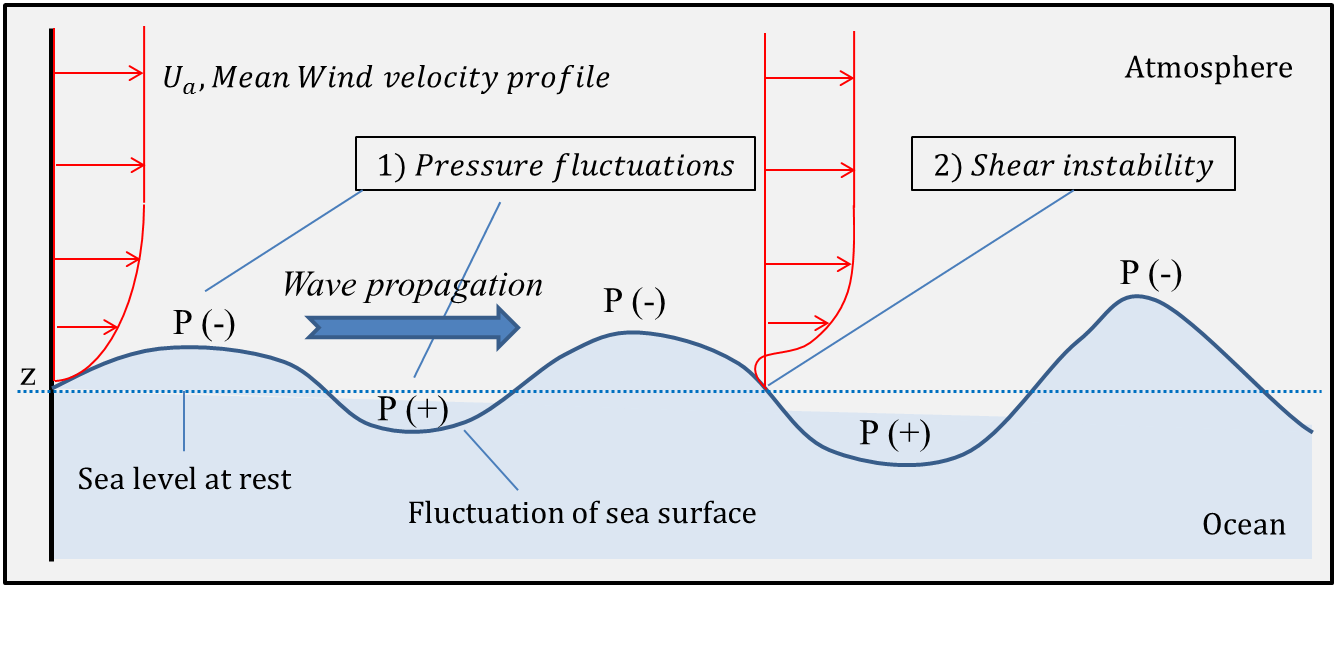
The wave formation mechanism

From "wind fluctuations": Wind wave formation is started by a random distribution of normal pressure acting on the water from the wind. By this mechanism, proposed by O.M. Phillips in 1957, the water surface is initially at rest, and the generation of the wave is initiated by turbulent wind flows and then by fluctuations of the wind, normal pressure acting on the water surface. Due to this pressure fluctuation arise normal and tangential stresses that generate wave behavior on the water surface.

The assumptions of this mechanism are as follows:

- The water is originally at rest;
- The water is inviscid;
- The water is irrotational;
- The normal pressure to the water surface from the turbulent wind is randomly distributed; and
- Correlations between air and water motions are neglected.

From "wind shear forces": In 1957, John W. Miles suggested a surface wave generation mechanism that is initiated by turbulent wind shear flows, $Ua(y)$, based on the inviscid Orr-Sommerfeld equation. He found that the energy transfer from wind to water surface as a wave speed, $c$, is proportional to the curvature of the velocity profile of wind, $Ua''(y)$, at the point where the mean wind speed is equal to the wave speed ($Ua = c$, where $Ua$ is the mean turbulent wind speed). Since the wind profile, $Ua(y)$, is logarithmic to the water surface, the curvature, $Ua''(y)$, has a negative sign at point $Ua=c$. This relation shows the wind flow transferring its kinetic energy to the water surface at their interface, and thence arises wave speed, $c$. The growth-rate can be determined by the curvature of the winds ($(d^2 Ua)/(dz^2 )$) at the steering height ($Ua (z=z_h)=c$) for a given wind speed, $Ua$.

The assumptions of this mechanism are:

- 2-dimensional, parallel shear flow, $Ua(y)$.
- Incompressible, inviscid water/wind.
- Irrotational water.
- Small slope of the displacement of the surface.

Generally, these wave formation mechanisms occur together on the ocean surface, giving rise to wind waves that eventually grow into fully developed waves. If one supposes a very flat sea surface (Beaufort number, 0), and sudden wind flow blows steadily across it, the physical wave generation process would be like this:

1. Turbulent wind flows form random pressure fluctuations at the sea surface. Small waves with a few centimeters order of wavelengths are generated by the pressure fluctuations (Phillips mechanism).
2. The cross wind keeps acting on the initially fluctuated sea surface. Then the waves become larger, and as they do so, the pressure differences increase, and the resulting shear instability expedites wave growth exponentially (Miles mechanism).
3. The interaction among the waves on the surface generates longer waves (Hasselmann et al., 1973) and this interaction transfers energy from the shorter waves generated by the Miles mechanism to those that have slightly lower frequencies than at the peak wave magnitudes. Ultimately, the wave speed becomes higher than that of the cross wind (Pierson & Moskowitz).

Conditions necessary for a fully developed sea at given wind speeds, and the parameters of the resulting waves
| Wind conditions | | | Wave size | | |
| Wind speed in one direction | Fetch | Wind duration | Average height | Average wavelength | Average period and speed |
|---|---|---|---|---|---|
| 19 km/h (12 mph; 10 kn) | 19 km (12 mi) | 2 h | 0.27 m (0.89 ft) | 8.5 m (28 ft) | 3.0 s, 2.8 m/s (9.3 ft/s) |
| 37 km/h (23 mph; 20 kn) | 139 km (86 mi) | 10 h | 1.5 m (4.9 ft) | 33.8 m (111 ft) | 5.7 s, 5.9 m/s (19.5 ft/s) |
| 56 km/h (35 mph; 30 kn) | 518 km (322 mi) | 23 h | 4.1 m (13 ft) | 76.5 m (251 ft) | 8.6 s, 8.9 m/s (29.2 ft/s) |
| 74 km/h (46 mph; 40 kn) | 1,313 km (816 mi) | 42 h | 8.5 m (28 ft) | 136 m (446 ft) | 11.4 s, 11.9 m/s (39.1 ft/s) |
| 92 km/h (57 mph; 50 kn) | 2,627 km (1,632 mi) | 69 h | 14.8 m (49 ft) | 212.2 m (696 ft) | 14.3 s, 14.8 m/s (48.7 ft/s) |

- (Note: Most of the wave speeds calculated from the wavelength divided by the period are proportional to the square root of the length. Thus, except for the shortest wavelength, the waves follow the deep water theory described in the next section. The 8.5 m long wave must be either in shallow water or between deep and shallow.)

== Development ==
Long swell waves develop from and take energy from the shorter wind waves. The process was first described by Klaus Hasselmann (2021 Nobel prize winner) after investigating the non-linear effects that are most pronounced near the peaks of the highest waves. He showed that, through these non-linearities, two wave trains in deep water can interact to generate two new sets of waves, one generally of longer and the other of shorter wavelength.

The equation that Hasselmann developed to describe this process is now used in the sea state models (for example Wavewatch III) used by all the major weather and climate forecasting centres. This is because both the wind sea and the swell have significant effects on the transfer of heat from the ocean to atmosphere. This affects both large scale climate systems, like the El Niño, and smaller scale systems, such as the atmospheric depressions that develop near the edges of the Gulf Stream.

A good physical description of the Hasselmann process is hard to explain, but the non-linear effects are largest near the peaks of the highest waves and the short waves, which often break near the same position, can be used as an analogy. This is because each small breaking wave gives a small push to the longer wave on which it is breaking. From the point of view of the long wave, it is receiving a small push on each of its crests just like a swing being given a small push at just the right time. There is also no comparable effect in the wave's trough - a term which would tend to reduce the size of the long wave.

From the point of view of a physicist this effect is of extra interest because it shows how, what starts as a random wave field, can generate the order of a long train of swell waves at the cost of the energy losses and increased disorder affecting all the small breaking waves. The sorting of sand grain sizes, often seen on a beach, is a similar process (as is a lot of life).

== Dissipation ==
The dissipation of swell energy is much stronger for short waves, which is why swells from distant storms are only long waves. The dissipation of waves with periods larger than 13 seconds is very weak but still significant at the scale of the Pacific Ocean. These long swells lose half of their energy over a distance that varies from over 20,000 km (half the distance round the globe) to just over 2,000 km. This variation was found to be a systematic function of the swell steepness: the ratio of the swell height to the wavelength. The reason for this behavior is still unclear, but it is possible that this dissipation is due to the friction at the air-sea interface.

== Swell dispersion and wave groups ==
Swells are often created by storms thousands of nautical miles away from the shores where they break, and the propagation of the longest swells is primarily limited by shorelines. For example, swells generated in the Indian Ocean have been recorded in California after more than half a round-the-world trip. This distance allows the waves comprising the swells to be better sorted and free of chop as they travel toward the coast. Waves generated by storm winds have the same speed and will group together and travel with each other, while others moving at even a fraction of a meter per second slower will lag behind, ultimately arriving many hours later due to the distance covered. The time of propagation from the source t is proportional to the distance X divided by the wave period T. In deep water it is $t = 4 \pi X /( g T)$ where g is the acceleration of gravity. For a storm located 10,000 km away, swells with a period T=15 s will arrive 10 days after the storm, followed by 14 s swells another 17 hours later, and so forth.

The dispersed arrival of swells, starting with the longest period, with a reduction in the peak wave period over time, can be used to calculate the distance at which swells were generated.

Whereas the sea state in the storm has a frequency spectrum with more or less the same shape (i.e. a well defined peak with dominant frequencies within plus or minus 7% of the peak), the swell spectra are more and more narrow, sometimes as 2% or less, as waves disperse further and further away. The result is that wave groups (called sets by surfers) can have a large number of waves. From about seven waves per group in the storm, this rises to 20 and more in swells from very distant storms.

== Coastal impacts ==
Just like for all water waves, the energy flux is proportional to the significant wave height squared times the group velocity. In deep water, this group velocity is proportional to the wave period. Hence swells with longer periods can transfer more energy than shorter wind waves. Also, the amplitude of infragravity waves increases dramatically with the wave period (approximately the square of the period), which results in higher run-up.

As swell waves typically have long wavelengths (and thus a deeper wave base), they begin the refraction process (see water waves) at greater distances offshore (in deeper water) than locally generated waves.

Since swell-generated waves are mixed with normal sea waves, they can be difficult to detect with the naked eye (particularly away from the shore) if they are not significantly larger than the normal waves. From a signal analysis point of view, swells can be thought of as a fairly regular (though not continual) wave signal existing in the midst of strong noise (i.e., normal waves and chop).

== Navigation ==
Swells were used by Micronesian navigators to maintain course when no other clues were available, such as on foggy nights.

== See also ==
- Surfing
