= Thermal capillary wave =

Thermal motion is able to produce capillary waves at the molecular scale. At this scale, gravity and hydrodynamics can be neglected, and only the surface tension contribution is relevant.

Capillary wave theory (CWT) is a classic account of how thermal fluctuations distort an interface. It starts from some intrinsic surface $h(x,y,t)$ that is distorted. Its energy will be proportional to its area:

$$E_\mathrm{st}= \sigma \int dx\, dy\, \left[\sqrt{1+\left( \frac{dh}{dx}\right)^2+\left(\frac{dh}{dy}\right)^2}-1\right]\approx \frac{\sigma}{2} \int dx\, dy\,  \left[ \left( \frac{dh}{dx}\right)^2+\left(\frac{dh}{dy}\right)^2 \right],$$

where the first equality is the area in this (de Monge) representation, and the second applies for small values of the derivatives (surfaces not too rough). The constant of proportionality, $\sigma$, is the surface tension.

By performing a Fourier analysis treatment, normal modes are easily found. Each contributes an energy proportional to the square of its amplitude; therefore, according to classical statistical mechanics, equipartition holds, and the mean energy of each mode will be $kT / 2$. Surprisingly, this result leads to a divergent surface (the width of the interface is bound to diverge with its area). This divergence is nevertheless very mild: even for displacements on the order of meters the deviation of the surface is comparable to the size of the molecules. Moreover, the introduction of an external field removes the divergence: the action of gravity is sufficient to keep the width fluctuation on the order of one molecular diameter for areas larger than about 1 mm2 (Ref. 2).

== See also ==
- Capillary wave
