= Gravity wave =

Wave where gravity is the main restoring force

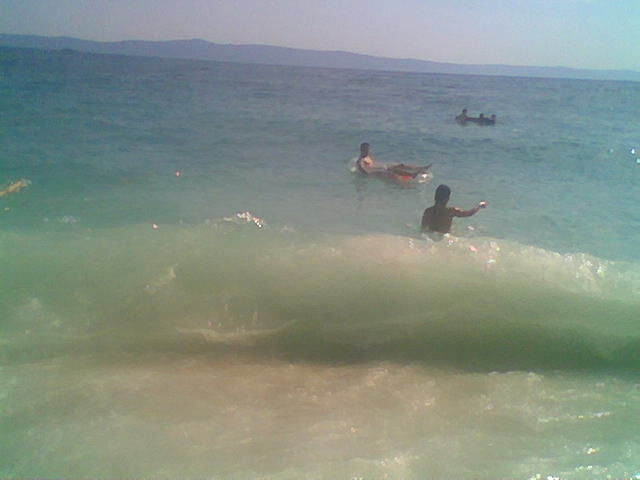
Surface gravity wave, breaking on an ocean beach in Tučepi, Croatia

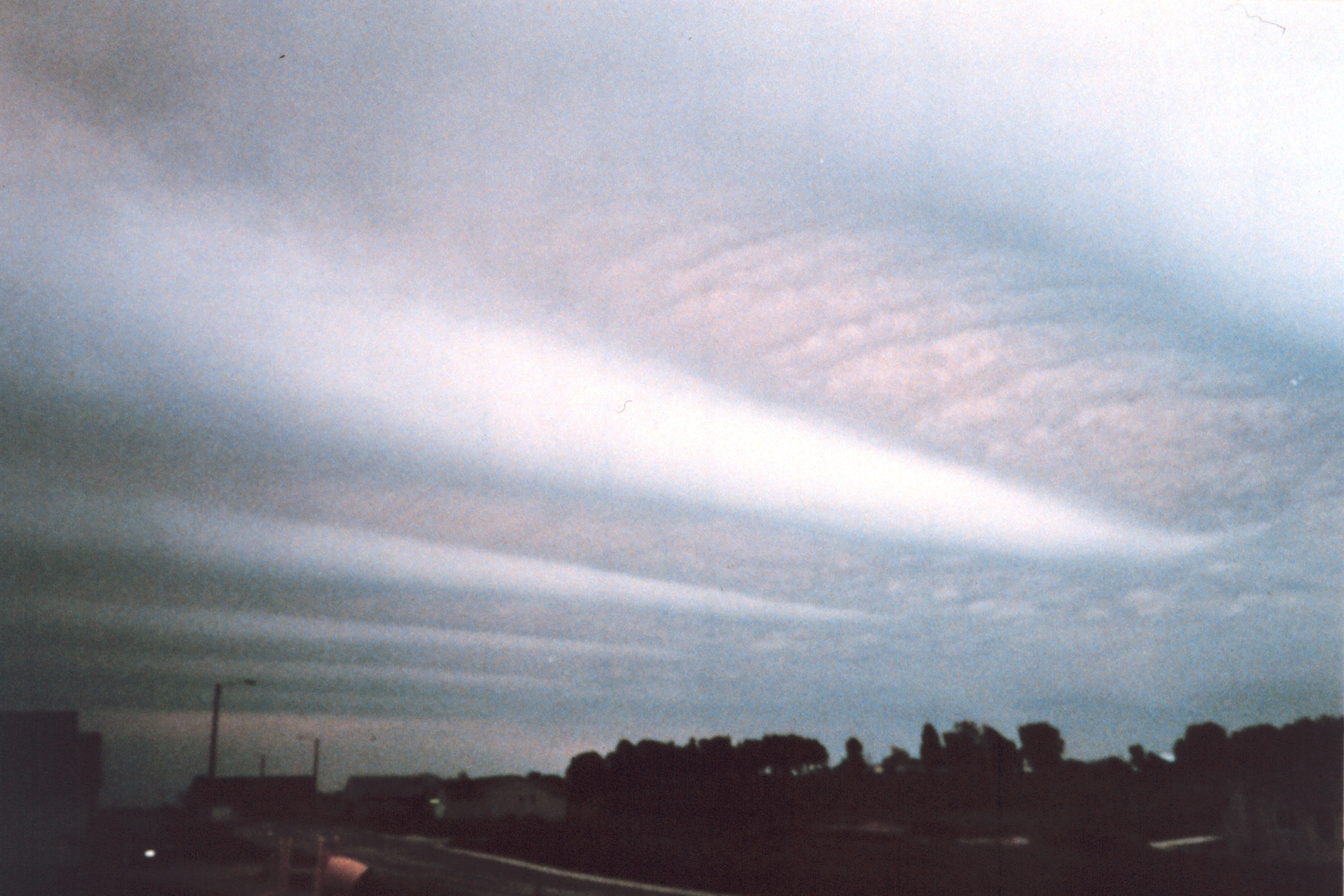
Wave clouds over Theresa, Wisconsin, United States

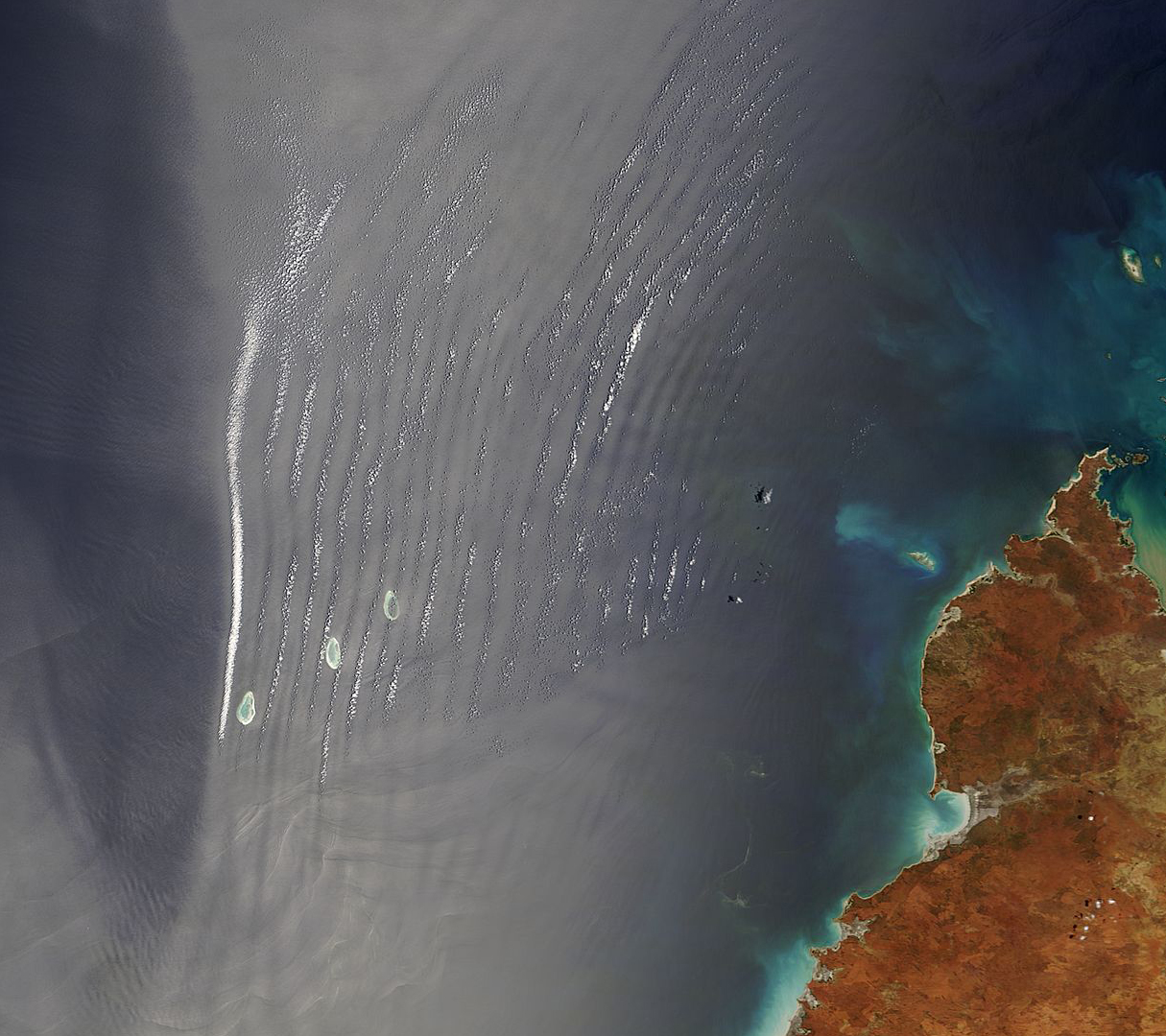
Wind-driven gravity waves in the Timor Sea, Western Australia, as seen from space

In fluid dynamics, gravity waves are waves in a fluid medium or at the interface between two media when the restoring force is gravity. Wind waves and ocean swell are surface gravity waves, with the interface being the water surface.

A gravity wave results when fluid is displaced from a position of equilibrium. The restoration of the fluid to equilibrium will produce a movement of the fluid back and forth, called a wave orbit. Waves on an air–sea interface of the ocean are surface waves, while gravity waves that are within the body of the water (such as between parts of different densities) are called internal waves. Other examples of gravity waves are tsunamis, ocean tides, and the wakes of surface vessels.

The period of wind-generated gravity waves on the free surface of the Earth's ponds, lakes, seas and oceans are predominantly between 0.3 and 30 seconds (corresponding to frequencies between 3 Hz and .03 Hz). Shorter waves are also affected by surface tension and are called gravity–capillary waves and (if hardly influenced by gravity, with periods under 0.1 seconds) capillary waves or capillary ripples. Alternatively, so-called infragravity waves, which are due to subharmonic nonlinear wave interaction with the wind waves, have periods longer than the accompanying wind-generated waves.

== Atmosphere dynamics on Earth ==
In the Earth's atmosphere, gravity waves are a mechanism that produces the transfer of momentum from the troposphere to the stratosphere and mesosphere. Gravity waves are generated in the troposphere by frontal systems or by airflow over mountains. At first, waves propagate through the atmosphere without appreciable change in mean velocity. But as the waves reach more rarefied (thin) air at higher altitudes, their amplitude increases, and nonlinear effects cause the waves to break, transferring their momentum to the mean flow. This transfer of momentum is responsible for the forcing of the many large-scale dynamical features of the atmosphere. For example, this momentum transfer is partly responsible for the driving of the Quasi-Biennial Oscillation, and in the mesosphere, it is thought to be the major driving force of the Semi-Annual Oscillation. Thus, this process plays a key role in the dynamics of the middle atmosphere.

Atmospheric gravity waves reaching ionosphere are responsible for the generation of traveling ionospheric disturbances and could be observed by radars.

== Quantitative description ==
=== Deep water ===
The phase velocity $c$ of a linear gravity wave with wavenumber $k$ is given by the formula

$c=\sqrt{\frac{g}{k}},$

where g is the acceleration due to gravity. When surface tension is important, this is modified to

$c=\sqrt{\frac{g}{k}+\frac{\sigma k}{\rho}},$

where σ is the surface tension coefficient and ρ is the density.

Details of the phase-speed derivation

The gravity wave represents a perturbation around a stationary state, in which there is no velocity. Thus, the perturbation introduced to the system is described by a velocity field of infinitesimally small amplitude, $(u'(x,z,t),w'(x,z,t)).$ Because the fluid is assumed incompressible, this velocity field has the streamfunction representation

$$\textbf{u}'=(u'(x,z,t),w'(x,z,t))=(\psi_z,-\psi_x),\,$$

where the subscripts indicate partial derivatives. In this derivation it suffices to work in two dimensions $\left(x,z\right)$, where gravity points in the negative z-direction. Next, in an initially stationary incompressible fluid, there is no vorticity, and the fluid stays irrotational, hence $\nabla\times\textbf{u}'=0.\,$ In the streamfunction representation, $\nabla^2\psi=0.\,$ Next, because of the translational invariance of the system in the x-direction, it is possible to make the ansatz

$$\psi\left(x,z,t\right)=e^{ik\left(x-ct\right)}\Psi\left(z\right),\,$$

where k is a spatial wavenumber. Thus, the problem reduces to solving the equation

$$\left(D^2-k^2\right)\Psi=0,\,\,\,\ D=\frac{d}{dz}.$$

We work in a sea of infinite depth, so the boundary condition is at $\scriptstyle z=-\infty.$ The undisturbed surface is at $\scriptstyle z=0$, and the disturbed or wavy surface is at $\scriptstyle z=\eta,$ where $\scriptstyle\eta$ is small in magnitude. If no fluid is to leak out of the bottom, we must have the condition

$$u=D\Psi=0,\,\,\text{on}\,z=-\infty.$$

Hence, $\scriptstyle\Psi=Ae^{k z}$ on $\scriptstyle z\in\left(-\infty,\eta\right)$, where A and the wave speed c are constants to be determined from conditions at the interface.

The free-surface condition: At the free surface $\scriptstyle z=\eta\left(x,t\right)\,$, the kinematic condition holds:

$$\frac{\partial\eta}{\partial t}+u'\frac{\partial\eta}{\partial x}=w'\left(\eta\right).\,$$

Linearizing, this is simply

$$\frac{\partial\eta}{\partial t}=w'\left(0\right),\,$$

where the velocity $\scriptstyle w'\left(\eta\right)\,$ is linearized on to the surface $\scriptstyle z=0.\,$ Using the normal-mode and streamfunction representations, this condition is $\scriptstyle c \eta=\Psi\,$, the second interfacial condition.

Pressure relation across the interface: For the case with surface tension, the pressure difference over the interface at $\scriptstyle z=\eta$ is given by the Young–Laplace equation:

$$p\left(z=\eta\right)=-\sigma\kappa,\,$$

where σ is the surface tension and κ is the curvature of the interface, which in a linear approximation is

$$\kappa=\nabla^2\eta=\eta_{xx}.\,$$

Thus,

$$p\left(z=\eta\right)=-\sigma\eta_{xx}.\,$$

However, this condition refers to the total pressure (base+perturbed), thus

$$\left[P\left(\eta\right)+p'\left(0\right)\right]=-\sigma\eta_{xx}.$$

(As usual, The perturbed quantities can be linearized onto the surface z=0.) Using hydrostatic balance, in the form $\scriptstyle P=-\rho g z+\text{Const.},$

this becomes

$$p=g\eta\rho-\sigma\eta_{xx},\qquad\text{on }z=0.\,$$

The perturbed pressures are evaluated in terms of streamfunctions, using the horizontal momentum equation of the linearised Euler equations for the perturbations,

$$\frac{\partial u'}{\partial t} = - \frac{1}{\rho}\frac{\partial p'}{\partial x}\,$$

to yield $\scriptstyle p'=\rho c D\Psi.$

Putting this last equation and the jump condition together,

$$c\rho D\Psi=g\eta\rho-\sigma\eta_{xx}.\,$$

Substituting the second interfacial condition $\scriptstyle c\eta=\Psi\,$ and using the normal-mode representation, this relation becomes $\scriptstyle c^2\rho D\Psi=g\Psi\rho+\sigma k^2\Psi.$

Using the solution $\scriptstyle \Psi=e^{k z}$, this gives

$c=\sqrt{\frac{g}{k}+\frac{\sigma k}{\rho}}.$

Since $\scriptstyle c=\omega/k$ is the phase speed in terms of the angular frequency $\omega$ and the wavenumber, the gravity wave angular frequency can be expressed as

$\omega=\sqrt{gk}.$

The group velocity of a wave (that is, the speed at which a wave packet travels) is given by

$c_g=\frac{d\omega}{dk},$

and thus for a gravity wave,

$c_g=\frac{1}{2}\sqrt{\frac{g}{k}}=\frac{1}{2}c.$

The group velocity is one half the phase velocity. A wave in which the group and phase velocities differ is called dispersive.

=== Shallow water ===
Gravity waves traveling in shallow water (where the depth is much less than the wavelength), are nondispersive: the phase and group velocities are identical and independent of wavelength and frequency. When the water depth is h,

$$c_p = c_g = \sqrt{gh}.$$

== Generation of ocean waves by wind ==
Wind waves, as their name suggests, are generated by wind transferring energy from the atmosphere to the ocean's surface, and capillary-gravity waves play an essential role in this effect. There are two distinct mechanisms involved, called after their proponents, Phillips and Miles.

In the work of Phillips, the ocean surface is imagined to be initially flat (glassy), and a turbulent wind blows over the surface. When a flow is turbulent, one observes a randomly fluctuating velocity field superimposed on a mean flow (contrast with a laminar flow, in which the fluid motion is ordered and smooth). The fluctuating velocity field gives rise to fluctuating stresses (both tangential and normal) that act on the air-water interface. The normal stress, or fluctuating pressure acts as a forcing term (much like pushing a swing introduces a forcing term). If the frequency and wavenumber $\scriptstyle\left(\omega,k\right)$ of this forcing term match a mode of vibration of the capillary-gravity wave (as derived above), then there is a resonance, and the wave grows in amplitude. As with other resonance effects, the amplitude of this wave grows linearly with time.

The air-water interface is now endowed with a surface roughness due to the capillary-gravity waves, and a second phase of wave growth takes place. A wave established on the surface either spontaneously as described above, or in laboratory conditions, interacts with the turbulent mean flow in a manner described by Miles. This is the so-called critical-layer mechanism. A critical layer forms at a height where the wave speed c equals the mean turbulent flow U. As the flow is turbulent, its mean profile is logarithmic, and its second derivative is thus negative. This is precisely the condition for the mean flow to impart its energy to the interface through the critical layer. This supply of energy to the interface is destabilizing and causes the amplitude of the wave on the interface to grow in time. As in other examples of linear instability, the growth rate of the disturbance in this phase is exponential in time.

This Miles–Phillips Mechanism process can continue until an equilibrium is reached, or until the wind stops transferring energy to the waves (i.e., blowing them along) or when they run out of ocean distance, also known as fetch length.

== Analog gravity models and surface gravity waves ==
Surface gravity waves have been recognized as a powerful tool for studying analog gravity models, providing experimental platforms for phenomena typically found in black hole physics. In an experiment, surface gravity waves were utilized to simulate phase space horizons, akin to event horizons of black holes. This experiment observed logarithmic phase singularities, which are central to phenomena like Hawking radiation, and the emergence of Fermi-Dirac distributions, which parallel quantum mechanical systems.

By propagating surface gravity water waves, researchers were able to recreate the energy wave functions of an inverted harmonic oscillator, a system that serves as an analog for black hole physics. The experiment demonstrated how the free evolution of these classical waves in a controlled laboratory environment can reveal the formation of horizons and singularities, shedding light on fundamental aspects of gravitational theories and quantum mechanics.

== Clear-air turbulence ==
Gravity waves are generated as air is forced to rise and sink over smaller mountain ranges, creating oscillations in buoyancy and vertical wind. These waves typically remain stable in gently stratified conditions like those found over ranges such as the Appalachians. However, as terrain height increases, the resulting vertical displacement amplifies these perturbations and enhances vertical wind shear. This destabilization can be quantified using the Richardson number, the ratio of buoyancy and flow shear. If the shear becomes strong enough, the stretching forces from wind gradients are more positive than the buoyant resistance which causes air layers to roll over each other. This can be further analyzed with the Kelvin-Helmholtz instability equation. This breakdown of wave structure results in clear-air turbulence, which is smaller scale atmospheric movement typically felt on aircraft.

== See also ==
- Acoustic wave – Type of energy propagation
- Asteroseismology – Study of oscillations in stars
- Green's law – Equation describing evolution of waves in shallow water
- Horizontal convective rolls – Long rolls of counter-rotating air
- Lee wave – Atmospheric stationary oscillations
- Lunitidal interval – Time lag from the Moon's culmination to the next high tide
- Mesosphere#Dynamic features – Layer of the atmosphere directly above the stratosphere and below the thermosphere
- Morning Glory cloud – Meteorological phenomenon
- Orr–Sommerfeld equation – Eigenvalue equation
- Rayleigh–Taylor instability – Unstable behavior of two contacting fluids of different densities
- Rogue wave – Unexpectedly large transient ocean surface wave
- Skyquake – Loud sound reported to come from the sky
