= Orr–Sommerfeld equation =

Eigenvalue equation

The linear neutral stability curve for plane Poiseuille flow as predicted by numerically solving the Orr-Sommerfeld equation.

The Orr–Sommerfeld equation, in fluid dynamics, is an eigenvalue equation describing the linear two-dimensional modes of disturbance to a viscous parallel flow. The solution to the Navier–Stokes equations for a parallel, laminar flow can become unstable if certain conditions on the flow are satisfied, and the Orr–Sommerfeld equation determines precisely what the conditions for hydrodynamic stability are.

The equation is named after William McFadden Orr and Arnold Sommerfeld, who derived it at the beginning of the 20th century.

== Formulation ==
A schematic diagram of the base state of the system. The flow under investigation represents a small perturbation away from this state. While the base state is parallel, the perturbation velocity has components in both directions.

The equation is derived by solving a linearized version of the Navier–Stokes equation for the perturbation velocity field

$$\mathbf{u} = \left(U(z)+u'(x,z,t), 0 ,w'(x,z,t)\right)$$,

where $(U(z), 0, 0)$ is the unperturbed or basic flow. The perturbation velocity has the wave-like solution $\mathbf{u}' \propto \exp(i \alpha (x - c t))$ (real part understood). Using this knowledge, and the streamfunction representation for the flow, the following dimensional form of the Orr–Sommerfeld equation is obtained:

$$\frac{\mu}{i\alpha\rho} \left({d^2 \over d z^2} - \alpha^2\right)^2 \varphi = (U - c)\left({d^2 \over d z^2} - \alpha^2\right) \varphi -  U'' \varphi$$,

where $\mu$ is the dynamic viscosity of the fluid, $\rho$ is its density, and $\varphi$ is the potential or stream function. In the case of zero viscosity ($\mu=0$), the equation reduces to Rayleigh's equation. The equation can be written in non-dimensional form by measuring velocities according to a scale set by some characteristic velocity $U_0$, and by measuring lengths according to channel depth $h$. Then the equation takes the form

$${1 \over i \alpha \, Re} \left({d^2 \over d z^2} - \alpha^2\right)^2 \varphi = (U - c)\left({d^2 \over d z^2} - \alpha^2\right) \varphi - U'' \varphi$$,

where

$$Re=\frac{\rho U_0 h}{\mu}$$

is the Reynolds number of the base flow. The relevant boundary conditions are the no-slip boundary conditions at the channel top and bottom $z = z_1$ and $z = z_2$,

$\alpha \varphi = {d \varphi \over d z} = 0$ at $z = z_1$ and $z = z_2,$ in the case where $\varphi$ is the potential function.

Or:

$\alpha \varphi = {d \varphi \over d x} = 0$ at $z = z_1$ and $z = z_2,$ in the case where $\varphi$ is the stream function.

The eigenvalue parameter of the problem is $c$ and the eigenvector is $\varphi$. If the imaginary part of the wave speed $c$ is positive, then the base flow is unstable, and the small perturbation introduced to the system is amplified in time.

The equation can also be derived for three-dimensional disturbances of the form

$$\mathbf{u} = \left(U(z)+u'(x,y,z,t), v'(x,y,z,t) ,w'(x,y,z,t)\right),$$

with $\mathbf{u}' \propto \exp(i \alpha (x - c t) + i \beta y)$ (real part understood). Any solution to the three-dimensional equation can be mapped back to a more unstable (lower Reynolds number) solution of the two-dimensional equation above due to Squire's theorem. It is therefore sufficient to study only two-dimensional disturbances when dealing with the linear stability of a parallel flow.

== Solutions ==
For all but the simplest of velocity profiles $U$, numerical or asymptotic methods are required to calculate solutions. Some typical flow profiles are discussed below. In general, the spectrum of the equation is discrete and infinite for a bounded flow, while for unbounded flows (such as boundary-layer flow), the spectrum contains both continuous and discrete parts.

The spectrum of the Orr–Sommerfeld operator for Poiseuille flow at criticality.

Dispersion curves of Poiseuille flow for various Reynolds numbers.

For plane Poiseuille flow, it has been shown that the flow is unstable (i.e. one or more eigenvalues $c$ has a positive imaginary part) for some $\alpha$ when $Re > Re_c = 5772.22$ and the neutrally stable mode at $Re = Re_c$ having $\alpha_c = 1.02056$, $c_r = 0.264002$. To see the stability properties of the system, it is customary to plot a dispersion curve, that is, a plot of the growth rate $\text{Im}(\alpha{c})$ as a function of the wavenumber $\alpha$.

The first figure shows the spectrum of the Orr–Sommerfeld equation at the critical values listed above. This is a plot of the eigenvalues, $c$, in the complex plane. The flow is said to be linearly unstable or linearly stable if the imaginary part of the uppermost eigenvalue is positive or negative respectively. At the critical values of Reynolds number and wavenumber, the imaginary part of the uppermost eigenvalue is exactly zero and such a solution is called neutrally stable. For higher values of Reynolds number, the uppermost eigenvalue shifts into the positive half of the complex plane. Then, a fuller picture of the stability properties is given by a plot exhibiting the functional dependence of this eigenvalue; this is shown in the second figure.

On the other hand, the spectrum of eigenvalues for Couette flow indicates stability, at all Reynolds numbers. However, in experiments, Couette flow is found to be unstable to small, but finite, perturbations for which the linear theory, and the Orr–Sommerfeld equation do not apply. It has been argued that the non-normality of the eigenvalue problem associated with Couette (and indeed, Poiseuille) flow might explain that observed instability. That is, the eigenfunctions of the Orr–Sommerfeld operator are complete but non-orthogonal. Then, the energy of the disturbance contains contributions from all eigenfunctions of the Orr–Sommerfeld equation. Even if the energy associated with each eigenvalue considered separately is decaying exponentially in time (as predicted by the Orr–Sommerfeld analysis for the Couette flow), the cross terms arising from the non-orthogonality of the eigenvalues can increase transiently. Thus, the total energy increases transiently (before tending asymptotically to zero). The argument is that if the magnitude of this transient growth is sufficiently large, it destabilizes the laminar flow, however this argument has not been universally accepted.

A nonlinear theory explaining transition, has also been proposed. Although that theory does include linear transient growth, the focus is on 3D nonlinear processes that are strongly suspected to underlie transition to turbulence in shear flows. The theory has led to the construction of so-called complete 3D steady states, traveling waves and time-periodic solutions of the Navier-Stokes equations that capture many of the key features of transition and coherent structures observed in the near wall region of turbulent shear flows. Even though "solution" usually implies the existence of an analytical result, it is common practice in fluid mechanics to refer to numerical results as "solutions" - regardless of whether the approximated solutions satisfy the Navier-Stokes equations in a mathematically satisfactory way or not. It is postulated that transition to turbulence involves the dynamic state of the fluid evolving from one solution to the next. The theory is thus predicated upon the actual existence of such solutions (many of which have yet to be observed in a physical experimental setup). This relaxation on the requirement of exact solutions allows a great deal of flexibility, since exact solutions are extremely difficult to obtain (contrary to numerical solutions), at the expense of rigor and (possibly) correctness. Thus, even though not as rigorous as previous approaches to transition, it has gained immense popularity.

An extension of the Orr–Sommerfeld equation to the flow in porous media has been recently suggested.

== Mathematical methods for free-surface flows ==
For Couette flow, it is possible to make mathematical progress in the solution of the Orr–Sommerfeld equation. In this section, a demonstration of this method is given for the case of free-surface flow, that is, when the upper lid of the channel is replaced by a free surface. Note first of all that it is necessary to modify upper boundary conditions to take account of the free surface. In non-dimensional form, these conditions now read

$\varphi={d \varphi \over d z}=0,$ at $z = 0$,

$\frac{d^2\varphi}{dz^2}+\alpha^2\varphi=0$, $\Omega\equiv\frac{d^3\varphi}{dz^3}+i\alpha Re\left[\left(c-U\left(z_2=1\right)\right)\frac{d\varphi}{dz}+\varphi\right]-i\alpha Re\left(\frac{1}{Fr}+\frac{\alpha^2}{We}\right)\frac{\varphi}{c-U\left(z_2=1\right)}=0,$ at $\,z=1$.

The first free-surface condition is the statement of continuity of tangential stress, while the second condition relates the normal stress to the surface tension. Here

$$Fr=\frac{U_0^2}{gh},\,\,\ We=\frac{\rho u_0^2 h}{\sigma}$$

are the Froude and Weber numbers respectively.

For Couette flow $U\left(z\right)=z$, the four linearly independent solutions to the non-dimensional Orr–Sommerfeld equation are,

$$\chi_1\left(z\right)=\sinh\left(\alpha z\right),\qquad \chi_2\left(z\right)=\cosh\left(\alpha z\right)$$,

$$\chi_3\left(z\right)=\frac{1}{\alpha}\int_\infty^z\sinh\left[\alpha\left(z-\xi\right)\right]Ai\left[e^{i\pi/6}\left(\alpha Re\right)^{1/3}\left(\xi-c-\frac{i\alpha}{Re}\right)\right]d\xi,$$

$$\chi_4\left(z\right)=\frac{1}{\alpha}\int_\infty^z\sinh\left[\alpha\left(z-\xi\right)\right]Ai\left[e^{5i\pi/6}\left(\alpha Re\right)^{1/3}\left(\xi-c-\frac{i\alpha}{Re}\right)\right]d\xi,$$

where $Ai\left(\cdot\right)$ is the Airy function of the first kind. Substitution of the superposition solution $\varphi=\sum_{i=1}^4 c_i\chi_i\left(z\right)$ into the four boundary conditions gives four equations in the four unknown constants $c_i$. For the equations to have a non-trivial solution, the determinant condition

$\left|\begin{array}{cccc}\chi_1\left(0\right)&\chi_2\left(0\right)&\chi_3\left(0\right)&\chi_4\left(0\right)\\ \chi_1'\left(0\right)&\chi_2'\left(0\right)&\chi_3'\left(0\right)&\chi_4'\left(0\right)\\ \Omega_1\left(1\right)&\Omega_2\left(1\right)&\Omega_3\left(1\right)&\Omega_4\left(1\right)\\ \chi_1''\left(1\right)+\alpha^2\chi_1\left(1\right)&\chi_2''\left(1\right)+\alpha^2\chi_2\left(1\right)&\chi_3''\left(1\right)+\alpha^2\chi_3\left(1\right)&\chi_4''\left(1\right)+\alpha^2\chi_4\left(1\right)\end{array}\right|=0$

must be satisfied. This is a single equation in the unknown c, which can be solved numerically or by asymptotic methods. It can be shown that for a range of wavenumbers $\alpha$ and for sufficiently large Reynolds numbers, the growth rate $\alpha c_{\text{i}}$ is positive.

== See also ==
- Gravitational comet-asteroid forcing events
- Gravity wave
- Lee waves
- Rogue wave
