= Run-up =

Run-up, Run up or runup, may be:

- Run-up (cricket), type of movement made by a bowler
- Run-up (aviation), aircraft verification procedure performed just prior to take-off
- Wave run-up, height to which sea waves run up the slope of a revetment, bank or dike
- The maximum height on land reached by a tsunami as it encounters the shore
- The area before the main track in tumbling
- "Run Up", a 2017 song by Major Lazer
- Run Up (Rina Aiuchi song)
- "Run Up", a 2016 song by Future from Purple Reign
