= Squire's theorem =

In fluid dynamics, Squire's theorem states that of all the perturbations that may be applied to a shear flow (i.e. a velocity field of the form $\mathbf{U} = (U(z), 0, 0)$), the perturbations which are least stable are two-dimensional, i.e. of the form $\mathbf{u}' = (u'(x,z,t),0,w'(x,z,t))$, rather than the three-dimensional disturbances. This applies to incompressible flows which are governed by the Navier–Stokes equations. The theorem is named after Herbert Squire, who proved the theorem in 1933.

Squire's theorem allows many simplifications to be made in stability theory. If we want to decide whether a flow is unstable or not, it suffices to look at two-dimensional perturbations. These are governed by the Orr–Sommerfeld equation for viscous flow, and by Rayleigh's equation for inviscid flow.
