= List of fluid flows named after people =

This is a list of fluid flows named after people (eponymous flows).

Flow	Description	Person(s) Named After
Beltrami flow	A flow in which velocity and vorticity are parallel to each other	Eugenio Beltrami
Berman flow	Laminar flow in channels with porous walls	Abraham S. Berman
Blasius flow	Boundary layer flows along a flat plate	Heinrich Blasius
Bickley jet	Planar jet at large Reynolds number	W. G. Bickley
Burgers vortex	Vortex in axisymmetric stagnation point flows	Jan Burgers
Burgers vortex sheet	Strained shear layer	Jan Burgers
Couette flow	Laminar flow between two parallel flat plates	Maurice Couette
Craya–Curtet jet	Jet emerging into a co-axial flow of larger radius	A. Craya and R. Curtet
Ekman layer	Flow with pressure gradient, Coriolis, and viscous forces	Vagn Walfrid Ekman
Falkner–Skan flow	Boundary layer flows with pressure gradient	V. M. Falkner and S. W. Skan
Fanno flow	Adiabatic compressible flow with friction	Gino Girolamo Fanno
Glauert jet	Wall jet	M. B. Glauert
Gromeka–Arnold–Beltrami–Childress flow	A type of inviscid Beltrami flow	Ippolit S. Gromeka, Vladimir Arnold, Eugenio Beltrami and Steven Childress
Guderley–Landau–Stanyukovich flow	Imploding shock waves	G. Guderley, Lev Landau and K. P. Stanyukovich
Hagen–Poiseuille flow	Laminar flow through pipes	Gotthilf Hagen and Jean Léonard Marie Poiseuille
Hele-Shaw flow	Viscous flow about a thin object filling a narrow gap between two parallel plates	Henry Selby Hele-Shaw
Hiemenz flow	Plane stagnation-point flow	Karl Hiemenz
Homann flow	Axisymmetric stagnation-point flow	Fritz Homann
Jeffery–Hamel flow	Viscous flow in a wedge shaped passage	George Barker Jeffery and Georg Hamel
Kerr–Dold vortex	Periodic counterrotating vortices in stagnation point flows	Oliver S. Kerr and John W. Dold
Kovasznay flow	Flow behind a two-dimensional grid	Leslie S. G. Kovasznay
Landau–Squire jet	Submerged round jet from a point source	Lev Landau and Herbert Squire
Landau–Levich flow	Flow created in thin film coating	Lev Landau and Veniamin Levich
Marangoni flow	Flow induced by gradients in the surface tension	Carlo Marangoni
Oseen flow	Low Reynolds number flows around sphere	Carl Wilhelm Oseen
Ostroumov flow	Flow induced by horizontal density gradients in thin fluid layers	Georgy Andreyevich Ostroumov
Plane Poiseuille flow	Laminar flow between two fixed parallel flat plates	Jean Léonard Marie Poiseuille
Prandtl–Meyer flow	Compressible isentropic flow along a deflected wall	Ludwig Prandtl and Theodor Meyer
Rayleigh flow	Inviscid compressible flow with heat transfer	Lord Rayleigh
Rayleigh problem	Flow due to sudden movement of a wall	Lord Rayleigh
Schlichting jet	Axisymmetric jet at large Reynolds number	Hermann Schlichting
Sampson flow	Flow through a circular orifice in a plane wall	R. A. Sampson
Schneider flow	Flow induced by jets and plumes	Wilhelm Schneider
Stefan flow	Movement of a chemical species by a flowing fluid	Joseph Stefan
Stokes flow	Creeping flows – very slow motion of the fluid	George Gabriel Stokes
Stokes problem	Flow due to oscillating wall	George Gabriel Stokes
Sullivan vortex	Two-cell vortex in axisymmetric stagnation flows	Roger D. Sullivan
Taylor–Couette flow	Flow in annular space between two rotating cylinders	Geoffrey Ingram Taylor and Maurice Couette
Taylor–Dean flow	Taylor–Couette flow with pressure gradient	Geoffrey Ingram Taylor and William Reginald Dean
Taylor–Culick flow	Inviscid flow inside porous cylinder	Geoffrey Ingram Taylor and F. E. C. Culick
Taylor–Green vortex	Spatially periodic array of counter-rotating vortices	Geoffrey Ingram Taylor and Albert E. Green
Taylor–Maccoll flow	Flow behind the shock wave attached to a solid cone	Geoffrey Ingram Taylor and J. W. Maccoll
Taylor–von Neumann–Sedov blast flow	Flow behind a blast wave	Geoffrey Ingram Taylor, John von Neumann and Leonid Sedov
Taylor scraping flow	Stokes flow for scraping fluid	Geoffrey Ingram Taylor
Trkalian flow	A special case of Beltrami flow	Viktor Trkal
Von Kármán swirling flow	Flow created by a rotating disk	Theodore von Kármán
Yih plume	Laminar plume from a point source of heat	Chia-Shun Yih
Zeldovich–Taylor flow	Flow behind detonation waves	Yakov Zeldovich and Geoffrey Ingram Taylor

== See also ==
- Eponym
- List of hydrodynamic instabilities named after people
- List of laws in science
- Scientific phenomena named after people
