= List of waves named after people =

Phenomena analysed as waves

This is a list of waves named after people (eponymous waves).

Wave	Field	Person(s) named after
Alfvén wave	Magnetohydrodynamics	Hannes Alfvén
Bloch wave	Solid state physics, condensed matter physics	Felix Bloch
Boriswave	Immigration	Boris Johnson
de Broglie wave	Quantum physics	Louis de Broglie
Elliott wave	Finance	Ralph Nelson Elliott
Faraday wave	Water waves	Michael Faraday
Gerstner wave	Water waves, oceanography	František Josef Gerstner
Kelvin wave	Oceanography, atmospheric dynamics	Lord Kelvin
Lamb wave	Acoustics, elastic waves	Horace Lamb
Mexican wave	Audience waves	Mexicans
Langmuir wave	Plasma physics	Irving Langmuir
Love wave	Elastodynamics, surface waves	Augustus Edward Hough Love
Mach wave	Fluid dynamics	Ernst Mach
Rayleigh wave or Rayleigh–Lamb wave	Surface acoustic waves, seismology	Lord Rayleigh and Horace Lamb
Rossby wave	Meteorology, oceanography	Carl-Gustaf Rossby
Stokes wave	Surface gravity waves, water waves	George Gabriel Stokes
Tollmien–Schlichting wave	Stability of laminar flows	Walter Tollmien and Hermann Schlichting

== See also ==
- Eponym
- List of eponymous laws
- Waves
- Scientific phenomena named after people
