= Lamb surface =

Smooth, connected 2D surfaces in fluid dynamics

In fluid dynamics, Lamb surfaces are smooth, connected orientable two-dimensional surfaces, which are simultaneously stream-surfaces and vortex surfaces, named after the physicist Horace Lamb. Lamb surfaces are orthogonal to the Lamb vector $\boldsymbol{\omega}\times\mathbf{u}$ everywhere, where $\boldsymbol{\omega}$ and $\mathbf{u}$ are the vorticity and velocity field, respectively. The necessary and sufficient condition are

$$(\boldsymbol{\omega}\times\mathbf{u})\cdot[\nabla\times(\boldsymbol{\omega}\times\mathbf{u})]=0, \quad \boldsymbol{\omega}\times\mathbf{u}\neq 0.$$

Flows with Lamb surfaces are neither irrotational nor Beltrami. But the generalized Beltrami flows has Lamb surfaces.

== See also ==
- Beltrami flow
