= Transition modeling =

Transition modeling is the use of a model to predict the change from laminar and turbulent flows in fluids and their respective effects on the overall solution. The complexity and lack of understanding of the underlining physics of the problems makes simulating the interaction between laminar and turbulent flow to be difficult and very case specific. Transition does have the wide range of turbulence options available for most computational fluid dynamics (CFD) applications for the following reasons:

- Transition involves a wide range of scales where the energy and momentum transfer are strongly influenced by inertial or non-linear effects that are unique to the simulation.
- Transition also occurs by different means, such as natural and bypass, and modeling all possibilities is difficult.

Most CFD programs use Reynolds-averaged Navier–Stokes equations, in which averaging eliminates linear disturbance.

== Common models ==
The following is a list of commonly employed transition models in modern engineering applications.

- Stability theory approach
- Intermittency Transport
- Laminar Fluctuation Energy Method
- Direct numerical simulation
- Large Eddy Simulation
- Gamma-Re Transition Model
