= Mangler Transformation =

The Mangler transformation, also known as the Mangler-Stepanov transformation (Stepanov 1947, Mangler 1948, Schlichting 1955), reduces the axisymmetric boundary layer equations to the plane boundary layer equations.

The transformation transforms the equations of axisymmetric boundary layer with external velocity $U$ in terms of original variables $x,y,u,v$ into the equations of plane boundary layer with external velocity $\bar{U}$ in terms of the new variables $\bar{x},\bar{y},\bar{u},\bar{v}$. The transformation is given by the formulas

$\begin{array}{l}\displaystyle \bar{x} = \frac{1}{L^2} \int\limits_0^x r^2(x) dx, \quad \bar{y} = \frac{r(x)}{L} y, \\ \displaystyle \bar{u} = u, \quad \bar{v} = \frac{L}{r} \left( v+\frac{r'}{r} y u \right), \\ \displaystyle \bar{U} = U, \end{array}$

where $L$ is a constant length, $r(x)$ is the distance from the point on the wall to the axis.
