= Folgar-Tucker Model =

Differential equation

The Folgar-Tucker-Equation (FTE) is a widespread and commercially applied model to describe the fiber orientation in injection molding simulations of fiber composites.

The equation is based on Jeffrey's equation for fibers suspended in melts, but, in addition, accounts for fiber-fiber interactions. Tucker and Advani then integrate over an ensemble of fibers and hence obtain an evolution equation for the orientation/alignment tensor as a Field (physics). A compact way to express it is

$\frac{dA}{dt}=W\cdot A-A\cdot W+\xi(D\cdot A+ A\cdot D-2A_4:D)+2C\dot{\gamma}(1-3A).$

The scalar quantities are the shear rate $\dot{\gamma}$, the interaction coefficient C (for an isotropic diffusion) and the parameter accounting for the fibers aspect ratio $\xi$. $A_4$ is a fourth order tensor. Normally, $A_4$ is expressed as a function of A. The detection of the best suited function is known as closure problem. D and W are respectively the symmetric and antisymmetric part of the velocity gradient, while 1 represents the unit tensor. $:$ represents a contraction over two indices.

Thus the Folgar Tucker is a differential equation for the second order tensor A, namely the orientation tensor. This evolution equation is in the frame of continuum mechanics and is coupled to the velocity field.

Since different closure forms can be inserted, many possible formulations of the equations are possible. For most of the closure forms the FTE results in a nonlinear differential equation (though a Lemma to linearize it for some popular closure was introduced).

Analytical solutions to some versions of the FTE consists of both exponential, trigonometrical and hyperbolic functions.

Numerically the FTE is solved also in commercial software for injection molding simulations.
