= Rosenhead =

Rosenhead is a surname. Notable people with the surname include:

- Jonathan Rosenhead (born 1938), British mathematician and activist
- Louis Rosenhead (1906–1984), British mathematician
