= Bickley jet =

Two-dimensional laminar plane jet

In fluid dynamics, Bickley jet is a steady two-dimensional laminar plane jet with large jet Reynolds number emerging into the fluid at rest, named after W. G. Bickley, who gave the analytical solution in 1937, to the problem derived by Schlichting in 1933 and the corresponding problem in axisymmetric coordinates is called as Schlichting jet. The solution is valid only for distances far away from the jet origin.

== Flow description ==
Consider a steady plane emerging into the same fluid, a type of submerged jets from a narrow slit, which is supposed to be very small (such that the fluid loses memory of the shape and size of the slit far away from the origin, it remembers only the net momentum flux). Let the velocity be $(u,v)$ in Cartesian coordinate and the axis of the jet be $x$ axis with origin at the orifice. The flow is self-similar for large Reynolds number (the jet is so thin that $u(x,y)$ varies much more rapidly in the transverse $y$ direction than the streamwise $x$ direction) and can be approximated with boundary layer equations.

$$\begin{align}
\frac{\partial u}{\partial x} + \frac{\partial v}{\partial y} &= 0,\\
u \frac{\partial u}{\partial x} + v \frac{\partial u}{\partial y} &= \nu \frac{\partial^2 u}{\partial y^2},
\end{align}$$

where $\nu$ is the kinematic viscosity and the pressure is everywhere equal to the outside fluid pressure. Since the fluid is at rest far away from the center of the jet

$u \rightarrow 0$ as $y\rightarrow\pm\infty$,

and because the flow is symmetric about $x$ axis

$v=0$ at $y=0$,

and also since there is no solid boundary and the pressure is constant, the momentum flux $M$ across any plane normal to the $x$ axis must be the same

$$M = 2\rho \int_0^\infty u^2 \, dy$$

is a constant, where $\rho$ which also constant for incompressible flow.

=== Proof of constant axial momentum flux ===
The constant momentum flux condition can be obtained by integrating the momentum equation across the jet.

$$\begin{align}
& \int_{-\infty}^\infty u \frac{\partial u}{\partial x} \, dy + \int_{-\infty}^\infty v \frac{\partial u}{\partial y} \, dy = \left[\nu  \frac{\partial u}{\partial y}\right]_{-\infty}^\infty, \\[10pt]
& \frac{d}{dx}\int_{-\infty}^\infty u^2 \, dy = 0, \quad \Rightarrow \quad \int_0^\infty u^2 \, dy = \text{constant}.
\end{align}$$

where
$$v \frac{\partial u }{\partial y} = \frac{\partial (uv)}{\partial y} - u \frac{\partial v}{\partial y}= \frac{\partial (uv)}{\partial y} +  u \frac{\partial u}{\partial x}$$
is used to simplify the above equation. The mass flux $Q$ across any cross section normal to the $x$ axis is not constant, because there is a slow entrainment of outer fluid into the jet, and it's a part of the boundary layer solution. This can be easily verified by integrating the continuity equation across the boundary layer.

$$\begin{align}
\int_{-\infty}^\infty  \frac{\partial u}{\partial x} \, dy + \int_{-\infty}^\infty  \frac{\partial v}{\partial y} \, dy &= 0,\\[8pt]
\frac{d}{dx} \int_{-\infty}^\infty u \, dy = - \Big[ v \Big]_{-\infty}^\infty &= - 2 v(x,\infty).
\end{align}$$

where symmetry condition $v(x,-\infty) = -v(x,\infty)$ is used.

== Self-similar solution ==
https://sites.ualberta.ca/~gswaters/Publications/abstracts/bickley.pdfThe self-similar solution is obtained by introducing the transformation
$$\eta = \frac{y}{x^{2/3}}, \quad u = \frac{6\nu}{x^{1/3}} F'(\eta), \quad v = \frac{2\nu}{x^{2/3}} (2\eta F'(\eta) - F(\eta))$$
the equation reduces to
$$F''' + 2FF'' + 2F'^2 = 0,$$
while the boundary conditions become
$$F'(\pm\infty) = 0, \quad F(0) = 0, \quad M = 72 \nu^2 \rho \int_0^\infty F'^2 \, d\eta.$$

The exact solution is given by
$$F(\eta) = \alpha \tanh \alpha\eta$$
where $\alpha$ is solved from the following equation
$$M = 72 \nu^2 \rho \int_0^\infty \operatorname{sech}^4\eta \, d\eta = 48 \nu^2\rho\alpha^3, \quad \Rightarrow \quad  \alpha = \left(\frac M {48\nu^2\rho} \right)^{1/3}.$$

Letting
$$\xi = \alpha \eta = 0.2752\left(\frac M {\nu^2\rho}\right)^{1/3} \frac y {x^{2/3}},$$

the velocity is given by
$$\begin{align}
u &= 0.4543 \left(\frac{M^2}{\nu\rho^2 x}\right)^{1/3} \operatorname{sech}^2\xi,\\
v &= 0.5503 \left(\frac{M\nu}{\rho x^2}\right)^{1/3} (2\xi \operatorname{sech}^2 \xi - \tanh \xi).
\end{align}$$

The mass flow rate $Q$ across a plane at a distance $x$ from the orifice normal to the jet is
$$Q = 2\rho \int_0^\infty u \, dy = 3.3019 \left(M\nu \rho^2 x\right)^{1/3}.$$

== See also ==
- Landau–Squire jet
