= Wilhelm Schneider (engineer) =

Austrian academic

- Born: 3 May 1938 (age 88); Vienna, Austria
- Education: TU Wien
- Known for: Schneider flow
- Scientific career
- Fields: Fluid mechanics
- Workplaces: TU Wien; Jet Propulsion Laboratory; DFVLR; Cornell University; CISM - International Centre for Mechanical Sciences
- Thesis: Analytische Berechnung achsensymmetrischer Überschallströmungen mit Stößen (1963)
- Doctoral advisor: Klaus Oswatitsch

Wilhelm Schneider (born May 3, 1938) is an Austrian scientist and a specialist in fluid mechanics. He is an is Emeritus Professor of at TU Wien.

== Biography and research ==
Wilhelm Schneider was born in Vienna, Austria in 1938. He graduated with a doctors' degree from TU Wien in 1963. He then worked at the DFVLR till 1968, at the Jet Propulsion Laboratory for a year, and then joined the DFVLR in 1969. He moved to TU Wien in 1973 and became an emeritus professor in 2006.

His research contributions are significant in many areas of fluid mechanics and related areas including supersonic and hypersonic flows, radiation gas dynamics, waves in fluids, jets, plumes & shear layers, convection flows, condensation, evaporation, fluidization, electric arcs and other topics.

He became the corresponding member of the Austrian Academy of Sciences in 1989 and a full member in 1995. He also served as the chairman of the academy from 2002 to 2006. He is the recipient of many awards including Ernst Mach prize (1966), Ludwig Prandtl Ring (2005) and others. He became the member of the European Academy of Sciences and Arts in 2011.

On his 60th birthday, an edited book titled Recent Advances in Boundary Layer Theory was published by Springer and on his 70th birthday the book
