= Bypass transition =

Scientific concept

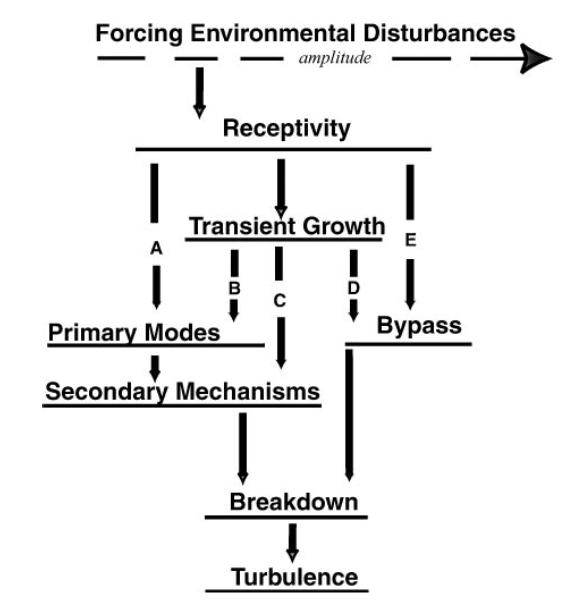
The path from receptivity to laminar-turbulent transition as illustrated by Morkovin, 1994.

A bypass transition is a laminar–turbulent transition in a fluid flow over a surface. It occurs when a laminar boundary layer transitions to a turbulent one through some secondary instability mode, bypassing some of the pre-transitional events that typically occur in a natural laminar–turbulent transition. (Note: Examples of events preceding natural transitions include the generation of two-dimensional Tollmien-Schlichting waves, spanwise vorticity, and three-dimensional vortex breakdown.)

== History ==
The bypass transition scenario was first observed experimentally by P. S. Klebanoff, during his experiments in elevated free-stream turbulence flow. Klebanoff identified an important aspect of the bypass transition. In an experiment using hot wires, he studied flow over a flat plate that was subjected to a 0.3% free-stream turbulence level. At this moderate free-stream turbulence level, he observed a velocity perturbation signal with a frequency under 12 Hz, much smaller than the usual Tollmien-Schlichting wave frequency. He also observed fluctuations in boundary layer thickness, which does not occur in low-turbulence free-stream flow.

== Pre-transitional flow structures ==
In bypass transition flow, the pre-transitional flow structures are different from those of very low turbulence free-stream flow. Through various laboratory experiments and computational studies, it has been observed that low frequency streaky flow structures are present in the laminar boundary layers. These streaky structures are called Klebanoff modes or K-modes.
