= William Mitchinson Hicks =

British mathematician and physicist

- Born: 23 September 1850; Launceston, Cornwall, England
- Died: 17 August 1934 (aged 83); Crowhurst, Sussex, England
- Education: St John's College
- Known for: Hicks equation
- Children: 3
- Awards: The William Hopkins Prize (1885)
- Scientific career
- Fields: Mathematics; Fluid Dynamics; Atomic structure

William Mitchinson Hicks, FRS (23 September 1850, in Launceston, Cornwall – 17 August 1934, in Crowhurst, Sussex) was a British mathematician and physicist. He studied at St John's College, Cambridge, graduating in 1873, and became a fellow at the college.

Hicks spent most of his career at Sheffield, contributing to the development of the university there. He was principal of Firth College from 1892 to 1897. In 1897, Firth College merged with two other colleges to form the University College of Sheffield, and Hicks was its first principal until 1905, when the college received its own royal charter and became the University of Sheffield. Hicks was the first vice chancellor of the university, serving from 1905.

From 1883 to 1892, he was Professor of Physics and Mathematics at Sheffield, and was Professor of Physics there from 1892 to 1917. He was elected a fellow of the Royal Society in 1885. He was awarded the Royal Society's Royal Medal in 1912: "On the ground of his researches in mathematical physics." In 1921, Hicks won the Adams Prize.

The Hicks Building at the University of Sheffield, which houses the departments of Physics and Astronomy, the Chemistry and Physics Workshop (formally known as the Central Mechanical Workshops) and the School of Mathematics and Statistics, is named in his honour. Hicks equation is named after him.
