= Hicks Building =

Coordinates: 53.3810°N 1.4861°W

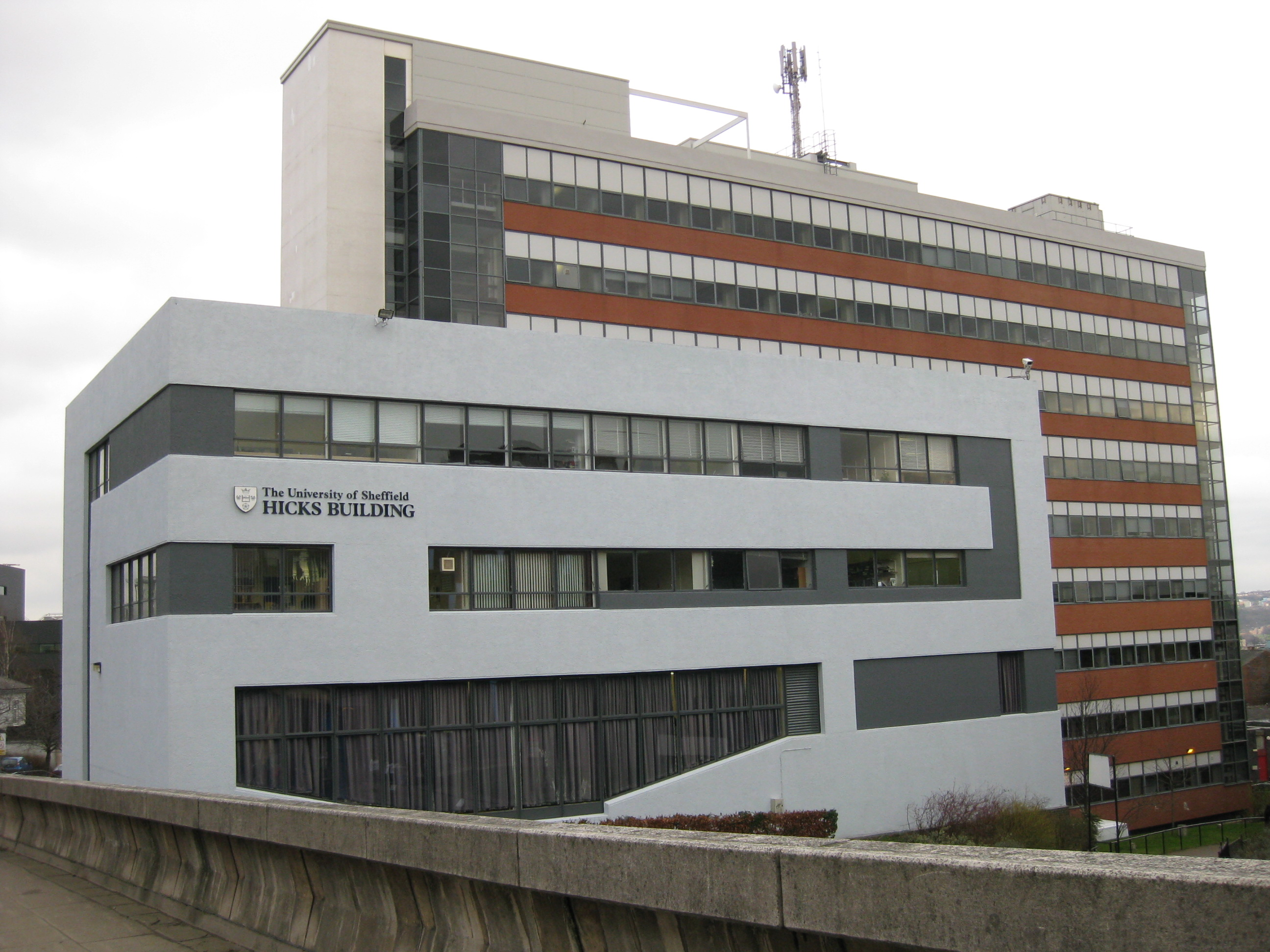
- The Hicks Building, viewed from Western Bank, showing the red-brick main building, and the smaller extension.
- Interactive map of the Hicks Building area

General information
- Type: Education
- Location: Sheffield, South Yorkshire
- Completed: 1950s

Height
- Height: 40 m

Technical details
- Floor count: 9 (plus 1 basement level)

Other information
- Public transit access: B Y University of Sheffield

The Hicks Building is a building in the city of Sheffield, South Yorkshire, England, part of the University of Sheffield. It is named in honour after William Mitchinson Hicks. It was completed in 1962 with an additional lower section joined by a bridge constructed immediately afterwards. but was reclad in 2005.

The building houses the school of mathematical and physical science which includes, the departments of Physics and Astronomy, the Chemistry and Physics Workshop (formally known as the Central Mechanical Workshops) and the School of Mathematics and Statistics, which comprises the departments of Probability and Statistics, Applied Mathematics and Pure Mathematics. It is in three sections: a taller building, with a roof height of around 40 metres (130 ft), clad in red-brick; a shorter, fully linked section which is only around 12 metres (39 ft) tall, clad in blue tiles and glass; and a section facing the University Concourse, around 15 metres (49 ft) tall, clad in blue, following a re-paint in 2010.
