= Lamb vector =

Mathematical object used in fluid dynamics

In fluid dynamics, Lamb vector is the cross product of vorticity vector and velocity vector of the flow field, named after the physicist Horace Lamb. The Lamb vector is defined as

$$\mathbf l = \mathbf{u} \times \boldsymbol{\omega}$$

where $\mathbf{u}$ is the velocity field and $\boldsymbol{\omega}=\nabla\times\mathbf{u}$ is the vorticity field of the flow. It appears in the Navier–Stokes equations through the material derivative term, specifically via convective acceleration term,

$$\mathbf u\cdot \nabla\mathbf u =  \frac{1}{2}\nabla\mathbf u^2 - \mathbf{u}\times\boldsymbol{\omega} =  \frac{1}{2}\nabla\mathbf u^2 - \mathbf l$$

In irrotational flows, the Lamb vector is zero, so does in Beltrami flows. The concept of Lamb vector is widely used in turbulent flows. The Lamb vector is analogous to electric field, when the Navier–Stokes equation is compared with Maxwell's equations.

== Gromeka–Lamb equation ==
The Euler equations written in terms of the Lamb vector is referred to as the Gromeka–Lamb equation, named after Ippolit S. Gromeka and Horace Lamb. This is given by

$$\nabla H = \mathbf l.$$

== Properties ==
The divergence of the lamb vector can be derived from vector identities,

$$\nabla\cdot\mathbf l = \mathbf u\cdot\nabla\times\boldsymbol\omega -\boldsymbol\omega\cdot H.$$

At the same time, the divergence can also be obtained from Navier–Stokes equation by taking its divergence. In particular, for incompressible flow, where $\nabla\cdot\mathbf u=0$, with body forces given by $-\nabla U$, the Lamb vector divergence reduces to

$$\nabla\cdot\mathbf l=-\nabla^2 H,$$

where

$$H= \frac{p}{\rho} + \frac{1}{2}\mathbf u^2+ U.$$

In regions where $\nabla\cdot\mathbf l\geq 0$, there is tendency for $\Phi$ to accumulate there and vice versa.
