= Ippolit S. Gromeka =

Russian scientist (1851–1889)

Ippolit Stepanovich Gromeka
- Born: 27 January 1851; Berdychiv, Kiev Governorate, Russian Empire (now, Berdychiv, Ukraine)
- Died: 13 October 1889 (aged 38); Kutaisi, Kutaisi Governorate, Russian Empire (now, Kutaisi, Georgia)
- Education: Imperial Moscow University; Kazan University
- Known for: Beltrami flow Gromeka–Arnold–Beltrami–Childress flow Gromeka–Lamb equation
- Scientific career
- Workplaces: Kazan University
- Thesis: Some cases of the motion of an incompressible fluid (1881)
- Notable students: Aleksandr Kotelnikov

Ippolit Stepanovich Gromeka (or Hippolyte Stepanovich Gromeka) was a 19th century Russian scientist who made significant contributions to the science of fluid mechanics.

== Biography ==
Ippolit was born on 27 January in 1851, in Berdychiv to Stepan Stepanovich Gromeka, a well-known publicist and a governor (1867–1875) of Siedlce and Yekaterina Fyodorovna Shcherbatska. He grew up in Siedlce and also earned a gold medal in the Siedlce high school. He completed his Bachelors degree from the Imperial Moscow University in 1873 and worked as a teacher in the university for two years. He then worked as a teacher in Moscow High School until 1879, and in Belsk high school from 1879. In 1879, he also completed his Master's degree with a dissertation on capillary phenomena. In 1880, he became an assistant professor at the Kazan University. In 1881, he obtained his PhD with a dissertation on Some cases of the motion of an incompressible fluid. He became a professor in 1882.

In the winter of 1888-1889, Gromeka fell from a sleigh during hunting with a severe bruise in his chest. Due to his injury, he died on 13 October 1889 in Kutaisi at the age of only 38. One of his brother, Mikhail Stepanovich Gromeka, was a well known literary critic, who died in 1883.

== Research ==
During his short research career, just over than 10 years, Gromeka has produced many important contributions to the field of fluid mechanics through 11 works, starting from his Master's thesis on capillary phenomena and his last work in 1889 on the effect of temperature distribution on sound waves. He provided an original and modern description of the capillarity phenomena, settling for the first time the discrepancy that was prevalent between Thomas Young's and Pierre-Simon Laplace's theories. He pioneered the studies on Beltrami flows in his PhD thesis in 1882 and because of it, he is referred as the father of the helical flows. He also studied unsteady flows in tubes, wave motion in elastic tubes and others.

His scientific works were published in Russian in 1952. A special issue in the journal Fluids in honour of Gromeka was produced in 2024.

=== Published works ===
Gromeka's published works are

- Gromeka. I.S. Essay on the Theory of Capillary Phenomena. Theory of Surface Fluid Adhesion (Master’s Thesis). Mat. Sb. 1879, 9, 435–500.
- Gromeka. I.S. Some Cases of Incompressible Fluid Flow. Ph.D. Thesis, Kazan University, Kazan, Russia, 1882; pp. 1–107.
- Gromeka. I.S. On the Theory of Fluid Motion in Narrow Cylindrical Tubes; Scientific notes of Kazan University; Kazan University: Kazan, Russia, 1882; pp. 1–32.
- Gromeka. I.S. On the Velocity of Propagation of Wave-Like Motion of Fluids in Elastic Tubes; Scientific notes of Kazan University; Kazan University: Kazan, Russia, 1883; pp. 1–19.
- Gromeka. I.S. On the Vortex Motions of a Liquid on a Sphere; Scientific Notes of Kazan University; Kazan University: Kazan, Russia, 1885; pp. 1–35.
- Gromeka. I.S. On the motion of liquid drops. Bull. De La Société Mathématique De Kasan Kasan 1886, 5, 8–47.
- Gromeka. I.S. Some cases of equilibrium of a perfect gas. Bull. De La Société Mathématique De Kasan Kasan 1886, 5, 66–82.
- Gromeka. I.S. Lectures on the Mechanics of Liquid Bodies; Kazan University Press: Kazan, Russia, 1887; pp. 1–174.
- Gromeka. I.S. On infinite values of integrals of second-order linear differential equations. Bull. De La Société Mathématique De Kasan Kasan 1887, 6, 14–40.
- Gromeka. I.S. On the Effect of Temperature on Small Variations in Air Masses; Scientific Notes of Kazan University; Kazan University: Kazan, Russia, 1888; pp. 1–40.
- Gromeka. I.S. Influence of the Uneven Distribution of the Temperature on the Propagation of Sound. Mat. Sb. 1889, 14, 283–302.
