= Hicks equation =

In fluid dynamics, Hicks equation, sometimes also referred as Bragg–Hawthorne equation or Squire–Long equation, is a partial differential equation that describes the distribution of stream function for axisymmetric inviscid fluid, named after William Mitchinson Hicks, who derived it first in 1898. The equation was also re-derived by Stephen Bragg and William Hawthorne in 1950 and by Robert R. Long in 1953 and by Herbert Squire in 1956. The Hicks equation without swirl was first introduced by George Gabriel Stokes in 1842. The Grad–Shafranov equation appearing in plasma physics also takes the same form as the Hicks equation.

Representing $(r,\theta,z)$ as coordinates in the sense of cylindrical coordinate system with corresponding flow velocity components denoted by $(v_r,v_\theta,v_z)$, the stream function $\psi$ that defines the meridional motion can be defined as

$$rv_r = - \frac{\partial \psi}{\partial z}, \quad rv_z = \frac{\partial \psi}{\partial r}$$

that satisfies the continuity equation for axisymmetric flows automatically. The Hicks equation is then given by

$$r\frac{\partial}{\partial r}\left(\frac{1}{r}\frac{\partial \psi}{\partial r} \right) + \frac{\partial^2 \psi}{\partial z^2} = r^2 \frac{\mathrm{d}H}{\mathrm{d} \psi} - \Gamma\frac{\mathrm{d} \Gamma}{\mathrm{d}\psi}$$

where

$$H(\psi) = \frac{p}{\rho} + \frac{1}{2}(v_r^2+v_\theta^2+v_z^2), \quad \Gamma(\psi) = rv_\theta$$

where $H(\psi)$ is the total head, cf. Bernoulli's Principle. and $2\pi\Gamma$ is the circulation, both of them being conserved along streamlines. Here, $p$ is the pressure and $\rho$ is the fluid density. The functions $H(\psi)$ and $\Gamma(\psi)$ are known functions, usually prescribed at one of the boundary; see the example below. If there are closed streamlines in the interior of the fluid domain, say, a recirculation region, then the functions $H(\psi)$ and $\Gamma(\psi)$ are typically unknown and therefore in those regions, Hicks equation is not useful; Prandtl–Batchelor theorem provides details about the closed streamline regions.

== Derivation ==
Consider the axisymmetric flow in cylindrical coordinate system $(r,\theta,z)$ with velocity components $(v_r,v_\theta,v_z)$ and vorticity components $(\omega_r,\omega_\theta,\omega_z)$. Since $\partial/\partial \theta=0$ in axisymmetric flows, the vorticity components are

$$\omega_r = -\frac{\partial v_\theta}{\partial z}, \quad \omega_\theta= \frac{\partial v_r}{\partial z} - \frac{\partial v_z}{\partial r}, \quad \omega_z = \frac{1}{r}\frac{\partial (rv_\theta)}{\partial r}$$.

Continuity equation allows to define a stream function $\psi(r,z)$ such that

$$v_r=-\frac{1}{r} \frac{\partial \psi}{\partial z}, \quad v_z = \frac{1}{r}\frac{\partial \psi}{\partial r}$$

(Note that the vorticity components $\omega_r$ and $\omega_z$ are related to $rv_\theta$ in exactly the same way that $v_r$ and $v_z$ are related to $\psi$). Therefore the azimuthal component of vorticity becomes

$$\omega_\theta = - \frac{1}{r}\left(\frac{\partial^2\psi }{\partial r^2} - \frac{1}{r}\frac{\partial \psi}{\partial r} + \frac{\partial^2\psi }{\partial z^2}\right).$$

The inviscid momentum equations $\partial\boldsymbol{v}/\partial t-\boldsymbol{v}\times\boldsymbol{\omega} = -\nabla H$, where $H= \frac{1}{2}(v_r^2+v_\theta^2+v_z^2) + \frac{p}{\rho}$ is the Bernoulli constant, $p$ is the fluid pressure and $\rho$ is the fluid density, when written for the axisymmetric flow field, becomes

$$\begin{align}
v_\theta \omega_z - v_z\omega_\theta - \frac{\partial v_r}{\partial t} &= \frac{\partial H}{\partial r},\\
v_z\omega_r - v_r \omega_z - \frac{\partial v_\theta}{\partial t}&=0,\\
v_r\omega_\theta - v_\theta \omega_r - \frac{\partial v_z}{\partial t} &= \frac{\partial H}{\partial z}
\end{align}$$

in which the second equation may also be written as $D(rv_\theta)/Dt=0$, where $D/Dt$ is the material derivative. This implies that the circulation $2\pi rv_\theta$ round a material curve in the form of a circle centered on $z$-axis is constant.

If the fluid motion is steady, the fluid particle moves along a streamline, in other words, it moves on the surface given by $\psi=$constant. It follows then that $H=H(\psi)$ and $\Gamma=\Gamma(\psi)$, where $\Gamma=rv_\theta$. Therefore the radial and the azimuthal component of vorticity are

$$\omega_r = v_r\frac{\mathrm d\Gamma}{\mathrm d\psi}, \quad \omega_z = v_z\frac{\mathrm d\Gamma}{\mathrm d\psi}$$.

The components of $\boldsymbol{v}$ and $\boldsymbol{\omega}$ are locally parallel. The above expressions can be substituted into either the radial or axial momentum equations (after removing the time derivative term) to solve for $\omega_\theta$. For instance, substituting the above expression for $\omega_r$ into the axial momentum equation leads to

$$\begin{align}
\frac{\omega_\theta}{r}&= \frac{v_\theta \omega_r}{r v_r} + \frac{1}{rv_r}\frac{\mathrm dH}{\mathrm d\psi} \frac{\partial \psi}{\partial z}\\
&= \frac{\Gamma}{r^2}\frac{\mathrm d\Gamma}{\mathrm d\psi}-\frac{\mathrm dH}{\mathrm d\psi}.
\end{align}$$

But $\omega_\theta$ can be expressed in terms of $\psi$ as shown at the beginning of this derivation. When $\omega_\theta$ is expressed in terms of $\psi$, we get

$$\frac{\partial^2 \psi}{\partial r^2} - \frac{1}{r} \frac{\partial \psi}{\partial r} + \frac{\partial^2 \psi}{\partial z^2} = r^2 \frac{\mathrm{d}H}{\mathrm{d} \psi} - \Gamma\frac{\mathrm{d} \Gamma}{\mathrm{d}\psi}.$$

This completes the required derivation.

== Example: Fluid with uniform axial velocity and rigid body rotation in far upstream ==
Consider the problem where the fluid in the far stream exhibit uniform axial velocity $U$ and rotates with angular velocity $\Omega$. This upstream motion corresponds to

$$\psi = \frac{1}{2}Ur^2, \quad \Gamma = \Omega r^2, \quad H = \frac{1}{2}U^2 + \Omega^2 r^2.$$

From these, we obtain

$$H(\psi) = \frac{1}{2}U^2 + \frac{2\Omega^2}{U} \psi, \qquad \Gamma(\psi) = \frac{2\Omega}{U} \psi$$

indicating that in this case, $H$ and $\Gamma$ are simple linear functions of $\psi$. The Hicks equation itself becomes

$$\frac{\partial^2 \psi}{\partial r^2} - \frac{1}{r} \frac{\partial \psi}{\partial r} + \frac{\partial^2 \psi}{\partial z^2} = \frac{2\Omega^2}{U} r^2 - \frac{4\Omega^2}{U^2} \psi$$

which upon introducing $\psi(r,z) = Ur^2/2 + r f(r,z)$ becomes

$$\frac{\partial^2 f}{\partial r^2} + \frac{1}{r} \frac{\partial f}{\partial r} + \frac{\partial^2 f}{\partial z^2}  + \left(k^2-\frac{1}{r^2}\right) f= 0$$

where $k=2\Omega/U$.

== Yih equation ==
For an incompressible flow $D\rho/Dt=0$, but with variable density, Chia-Shun Yih derived the necessary equation. The velocity field is first transformed using Yih transformation

$$(v_r',v_\theta',v_z') = \sqrt{\frac{\rho}{\rho_0}}(v_r,v_\theta,v_z)$$

where $\rho_0$ is some reference density, with corresponding Stokes streamfunction $\psi'$ defined such that

$$rv_r' = - \frac{\partial \psi'}{\partial z}, \quad rv_z' = \frac{\partial \psi'}{\partial r}.$$

Let us include the gravitational force acting in the negative $z$ direction. The Yih equation is then given by

$$\frac{\partial^2 \psi'}{\partial r^2} - \frac{1}{r} \frac{\partial \psi'}{\partial r} + \frac{\partial^2 \psi'}{\partial z^2} = r^2 \frac{\mathrm{d}H}{\mathrm{d} \psi'} - r^2 \frac{\mathrm{d}\rho}{\mathrm{d}\psi'}\frac{g}{\rho_0}z - \Gamma\frac{\mathrm{d} \Gamma}{\mathrm{d}\psi'}$$

where

$$H(\psi') = \frac{p}{\rho_0} + \frac{\rho}{2\rho_0}(v_r'^2+v_\theta'^2+v_z'^2) + \frac{\rho}{\rho_0} g z, \quad \Gamma(\psi') = rv_\theta'$$
