= Arnold–Beltrami–Childress flow =

The Arnold–Beltrami–Childress (ABC) flow or Gromeka–Arnold–Beltrami–Childress (GABC) flow is a three-dimensional incompressible velocity field which is an exact solution of Euler's equation. It is named after Vladimir Arnold, Eugenio Beltrami, and Stephen Childress. Ippolit S. Gromeka's (1881) name has been historically neglected, though much of the discussion has been done by him first. It is notable as a simple example of a fluid flow that can have chaotic trajectories. Its representation in Cartesian coordinates is the following:

$$\dot{x} = A \sin z + C \cos y,$$
$$\dot{y} = B \sin x + A \cos z,$$
$$\dot{z} = C \sin y + B \cos x,$$

where $(\dot{x},\dot{y},\dot{z})$ is the material derivative of the Lagrangian motion of a fluid parcel located at $(x(t),y(t),z(t)).$

This ABС flow was analyzed by Dombre et al. 1986 who gave it the name A-B-C because this example was independently introduced by Arnold (1965) and Childress (1970) as an interesting class of Beltrami flows. For some values of the parameters, e.g., A=B=0, this flow is very simple because particle trajectories are helical screw lines. For some other values of the parameters, however, these flows are ergodic and particle trajectories are everywhere dense. The last result is a counterexample to some statements in traditional textbooks on fluid mechanics that vortex lines are either closed or they can not end in the fluid. That is, because for the ABC flows we have $\omega=\lambda v$, vortex lines coincide with the particle trajectories and they are also everywhere dense for some values of the parameters A, B and C.

== See also ==
- Beltrami flow
- Taylor–Green vortex
