= Berman flow =

In fluid dynamics, Berman flow is a steady flow created inside a rectangular channel with two equally porous walls, through which fluid is injected from one side and extracted from other side with the constant uniform velocity. The concept is named after a scientist Abraham S. Berman who formulated the problem in 1953.

== Flow description ==
Consider a rectangular channel of width much longer than the height. Let the distance between the top and bottom wall be $2h$ and choose the coordinates such that $x=0, \ y=0$ lies in the midway between the two walls, with $y$ points perpendicular to the planes. Let both walls be porous with equal velocity $V$. Then the continuity equation and Navier–Stokes equations for incompressible fluid become

$$\begin{align}
\frac{\partial u}{\partial x} + \frac{\partial v}{\partial y} &=0 \\
u\frac{\partial u}{\partial x} + v \frac{\partial u}{\partial y} & = - \frac{1}{\rho} \frac{\partial p}{\partial x} + \nu \left(\frac{\partial^2 u}{\partial x^2} + \frac{\partial^2 u}{\partial y^2}\right), \\
u\frac{\partial v}{\partial x} + v \frac{\partial v}{\partial y} & = - \frac{1}{\rho} \frac{\partial p}{\partial y} + \nu \left(\frac{\partial^2 v}{\partial x^2} + \frac{\partial^2 v}{\partial y^2}\right)
\end{align}$$

with boundary conditions

$$u(x,\pm h) = 0, \quad \left(\frac{\partial u}{\partial y}\right)_{y=0}=0, \quad v(x,0)=0, \quad v(x,\pm h) = V$$

The boundary conditions at the center is due to symmetry. Since the solution is symmetric above the plane $y=0$, it is enough to describe only half of the flow, say for $y>0$. If we look for $v$ a solution, that is independent of $x$, the continuity equation dictates that the horizontal velocity $u$ can at most be a linear function of $x$. Therefore, Berman introduced the following form,

$$\eta = \frac{y}{h}, \quad \psi(x,\eta) = [h\bar u_o-xV]f(\eta), \quad u = \left(\bar u_o - \frac{Vx}{h}\right)f'(\eta), \quad v=V f(\eta)$$

where $\bar u_0$ is the average value (averaged cross-sectionally) of $u$ at $x=0$, that is to say

$$\bar u_0 = \frac{1}{2}\int_{-1}^{1} u(0,\eta)  d\eta=\frac{\bar u_0}{2} \int_{-1}^1f'(\eta) d\eta=\frac{\bar u_0}{2} [f(1)-f(-1)] = \bar u_0$$

This constant will be eliminated out of the problem and will have no influence on the solution. Substituting this into the momentum equation leads to

$$\begin{align}
- \frac{1}{\rho} \frac{\partial p}{\partial x} &= \left(\bar u_o - \frac{Vx}{h}\right) \left(-\frac{V}{h}[f'^2 - ff'']- \frac{\nu}{h^2}f''' \right), \\
- \frac{1}{\rho} \frac{\partial p}{\partial \eta} &= \nu \frac{dv}{d\eta} - \frac{\nu}{h} \frac{d^2 v}{d\eta^2}
\end{align}$$

Berman flow

Differentiating the second equation with respect to $x$ gives $\partial^2 p/\partial x\partial\eta =0$ this can substituted into the first equation after taking the derivative with respect to $\eta$ which leads to

$$f^{iv} + \operatorname{Re} (f'^2 - ff'')'=0$$

where $\operatorname{Re} = Vh/\nu$ is the Reynolds number. Integrating once, we get

$$f''' + \operatorname{Re} (f'^2 - ff'') = C$$

with boundary conditions

$$f(0)=f''(0)= f(1)-1=f'(1)=0$$

This third order nonlinear ordinary differential equation requires three boundary condition and the fourth boundary condition is to determine the constant $C$. and this equation is found to possess multiple solutions. The figure shows the numerical solution for low Reynolds number, solving the equation for large Reynolds number is not a trivial computation.

=== Limiting solutions ===
In the limit $Re\rightarrow 0$, the solution can be written as

$$f(\eta) = \frac{1}{2}(3\eta-\eta^3) + \frac{Re}{280}(3\eta^3-2\eta-\eta^7) + O(Re^2).$$

In the limit $Re\rightarrow -\infty$, the leading-order solution is given by

$$f(\eta) = \sin \frac{\pi}{2}\eta.$$

The above solution satisfies all the necessary boundary conditions even though Reynolds number is infinite (see also Taylor–Culick flow)

== Axisymmetric case ==
The corresponding problem in porous pipe flows was addressed by S. W. Yuan and A. Finkelstein in 1955.

== See also ==
- Taylor–Culick flow
