= Louis Rosenhead =

British mathematician

Louis Rosenhead CBE (1 January 1906 – 10 November 1984) was a British mathematician noted for his work on fluid mechanics, and was head of the Department of Applied Mathematics at Liverpool University from 1933 to 1973.

== Life ==
Rosenhead was born in Mabgate, Leeds, on 1 January 1906 to parents from Poland, the first of three children. His parents Abram Rozenkopf (born 1879) and Chaja Nagacz (born 1884) came from adjacent villages in Poland. They were married in Leeds in 1905, adopting the Anglicized versions of their names: Abraham and Ellen Rosenhead. Abraham was a tailor who did his national service in Russia and came to England in 1903; Ellen came in 1902. They were Jewish.

Rosenhead married Esther Brostoff in Leeds in 1932. Together they had two sons, Martin and Jonathan.

Rosenhead died 10 November 1984.

== Education ==
Rosenhead matriculated from Leeds High School and went to the University of Leeds to study medicine, but after four weeks changed his studies to mathematics. His decision was influenced by Selig Brodetsky. Rosenhead graduated with first class honours in 1926, and continuing, eventually to attain a Ph.D. in 1928, studying under Brodetsky. He then earned another Ph.D. at St John's College, Cambridge, studying under Harold Jeffreys. This was followed by spending the academic year 1930-31 in Göttingen where Ludwig Prandtl was active. Rosenhead spent time there along with Sydney Goldstein and H. B. Squire, all working on theoretical fluid mechanics.

== Career ==
In 1931 Rosenhead became assistant lecturer in applied mathematics at University College, Swansea. In 1933 he replaced Joseph Proudman as professor of applied mathematics at Liverpool.

During World War II, Rosenhead was superintendent of ballistics at the Projectile Development Establishment and collected a team of mathematicians to work on rocket weapons.

Rosenhead was elected a Fellow of the Royal Society in 1946.

In 1947 he was instrumental in developing statistics and in the appointment of Robin Plackett. His colleagues also included Maurice Bartlett, P. A. P. Moran and D. G. Kendall.
