= Schlichting jet =

Schlichting jet is a steady, laminar, round jet, emerging into a stationary fluid of the same kind with very high Reynolds number. The problem was formulated and solved by Hermann Schlichting in 1933, who also formulated the corresponding planar Bickley jet problem in the same paper. The Landau-Squire jet from a point source is an exact solution of Navier-Stokes equations, which is valid for all Reynolds number, reduces to Schlichting jet solution at high Reynolds number, for distances far away from the jet origin.

== Flow description ==
Consider an axisymmetric jet emerging from an orifice, located at the origin of a cylindrical polar coordinates $(r,x)$, with $x$ being the jet axis and $r$ being the radial distance from the axis of symmetry. Since the jet is in constant pressure, the momentum flux in the $x$ direction is constant and equal to the momentum flux at the origin,

$$J=2\pi\rho \int_0^\infty ru^2 d r = \text{constant},$$

where $\rho$ is the constant density, $(v,u)$ are the velocity components in $r$ and $x$ direction, respectively and $J$ is the known momentum flux at the origin. The quantity $K=J/\rho$ is called as the kinematic momentum flux. The boundary layer equations are

$$\begin{align}
\frac{\partial u}{\partial x} + \frac{1}{r}\frac{\partial (rv)}{\partial r}  &=0,\\
u \frac{\partial u}{\partial x} + v \frac{\partial u}{\partial r} &= \frac{\nu}{r}\frac{\partial }{\partial r}\left(r\frac{\partial u}{\partial r}\right),
\end{align}$$

where $\nu$ is the kinematic viscosity. The boundary conditions are

$$\begin{align}
r=0: &\quad v=0,\quad \frac{\partial u}{\partial r} =0, \\
r\rightarrow\infty: &\quad u=0.
\end{align}$$

The Reynolds number of the jet,

$$Re = \frac{1}{\nu}\left(\frac{J}{2\pi\rho}\right)^{1/2}=\frac{1}{\nu}\left(\frac{K}{2\pi}\right)^{1/2}\gg 1$$

is a large number for the Schlichting jet.

== Self-similar solution ==
A self-similar solution exists for the problem posed. The self-similar variables are

$$\eta = \frac{r}{x}, \quad u = \frac{\nu}{x}\frac{F'(\eta)}{\eta}, \quad v = \frac{\nu}{x}\left[F'(\eta)-\frac{F(\eta)}{\eta}\right].$$

Then the boundary layer equation reduces to

$$\eta F'' + F F' - F' =0$$

with boundary conditions $F(0)=F'(0)=0$. If $F(\eta)$ is a solution, then $F(\gamma\eta)=F(\xi)$ is also a solution. A particular solution which satisfies the condition at $\eta=0$ is given by

$$F=\frac{4\xi^2}{4+\xi^2} = \frac{4\gamma^2\eta^2}{4+\gamma^2\eta^2}.$$

The constant $\gamma$ can be evaluated from the momentum condition,

$$\gamma^2 = \frac{3J}{16\pi\rho\nu^2}=\frac{3 {\rm Re}^2}{8}.$$

Thus the solution is

$$F(\eta)=\frac{4({\rm Re}\,\eta)^2}{32/3+({\rm Re}\,\eta)^2}.$$

Unlike the momentum flux, the volume flow rate in the $x$ is not constant, but increases due to slow entrainment of the outer fluid by the jet,

$$Q = 2\pi\int_0^\infty r u dr = 8 \pi \nu x,$$

increases linearly with distance along the axis. Schneider flow describes the flow induced by the jet due to the entrainment.

== Other variations ==
Schlichting jet for the compressible fluid has been solved by M.Z. Krzywoblocki and D.C. Pack. Similarly, Schlichting jet with swirling motion is studied by H. Görtler.

== See also ==
- Landau-Squire jet
- Schneider flow
- Bickley jet
