= Horace Lamb =

English mathematician (1849–1934)

Sir Horace Lamb FRS
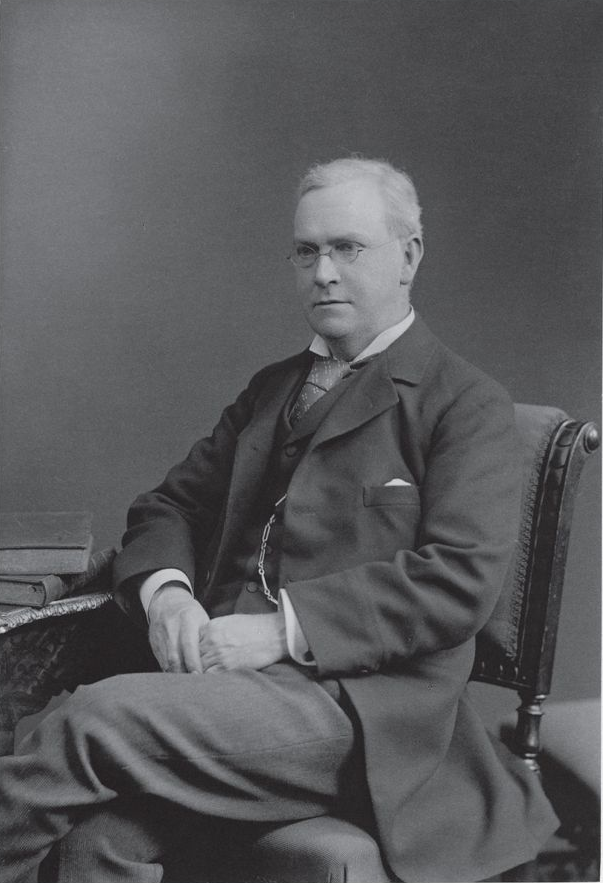
- Lamb, 1885
- Born: 27 November 1849; Stockport, Cheshire, England
- Died: 4 December 1934 (aged 85); Cambridge, England
- Education: Trinity College, Cambridge
- Occupations: Applied mathematician; author
- Known for: Lamb vector Lamb–Oseen vortex Lamb–Chaplygin dipole Lamb waves Lamb surfaces Skin effect Volume viscosity
- Awards: Smith's Prize (1872); The William Hopkins Prize (1888); Royal Medal (1902); De Morgan Medal (1911); Copley Medal (1923)
- Scientific career
- Fields: Mathematics; physics
- Workplaces: University of Cambridge; University of Adelaide; University of Manchester; Royal Society
- Academic advisors: James Clerk Maxwell; George Gabriel Stokes

Sir Horace Lamb (27 November 1849 – 4 December 1934) was a British applied mathematician and author of several influential texts on classical physics, among them Hydrodynamics (1895) and Dynamical Theory of Sound (1910). Both of these books remain in print. The word vorticity was not coined by Lamb—it appears in English scientific literature as early as the 1880s (for example, in the Philosophical Magazine), and the underlying mathematical concept was introduced by Hermann von Helmholtz in 1858—though Lamb's influential work helped to popularise the term in the English-speaking world.

== Early life and education ==
Lamb was born in Stockport, Cheshire, the son of John Lamb and his wife Elizabeth, née Rangeley. John Lamb was a foreman in a cotton mill who had gained some distinction by the invention of an improvement to spinning machines, he died when his son was a child. Lamb's mother married again, and soon afterwards Horace went to live with his strict maternal aunt, Mrs. Holland. He studied at Stockport Grammar School, where he made the acquaintance of a wise and kindly headmaster in the Rev. Charles Hamilton, and a graduate of classics, Frederic Slaney Poole, who in his final year became a good friend. It was from these two tutors that Lamb acquired his interest in mathematics and, to a somewhat lesser extent, classical literature.

In 1867, he gained a classical scholarship at Queens' College, Cambridge. Since Lamb's inclination, however, was to pursue a career in engineering, he chose to decline the offer, and instead worked for a year at the Owens College in nearby Manchester, as a means of developing his mathematical proficiency further.

At that time, the Chair of Pure Mathematics at Owens College was held by Thomas Barker, an eminent Scottish mathematician, who graduated as Senior Wrangler and first Smith's prizeman from the Cambridge Mathematical Tripos in 1862. An acknowledged lecturer of high quality, Lamb prospered under the guidance of Barker, and was elected to a minor scholarship at Trinity College, Cambridge.

At Trinity, he was Second Wrangler in the Mathematical Tripos, 2nd Smith's prizeman and elected fellow in 1872. Among his professors were James Clerk Maxwell and George Gabriel Stokes. He was soon elected both a Fellow and a tutor in the college.

== Career ==
=== University of Cambridge, 1872–75 ===
By 1874, Lamb had become thoroughly invested in his work at Trinity, preparing there an innovative and original series of lectures on the subject of hydrodynamics for third-year students. Richard Glazebrook, a final-year student at the time, wrote of them that they were 'a revelation', and praised Lamb for his lucid presentation of the properties of liquids in rotational motion. However, Lamb soon became romantically involved with Elizabeth Foot, sister-in-law to his former headmaster, and, since the conditions of his position at Trinity stipulated that he should hold it only so long as he was unmarried, he was compelled, in 1875, to resign and continue his work elsewhere.

=== University of Adelaide, 1876–1885 ===
Lamb's acquaintance from Stockport, Frederic Slaney Poole, had by now for some years lived in South Australia; hearing of his engagement, Poole suggested in a letter that he should apply for the chair at the recently founded University of Adelaide. In 1875, he was appointed the first (Sir Thomas) Elder Professor of Mathematics there, and took up the chair in March, 1876. Lamb was instrumental in the establishment of the academic and administrative structure of the university, and lectured in pure and applied mathematics, also giving practical demonstrations in physics. For the next ten years, the average number of students enrolled in the Bachelor of Arts course at Adelaide was fewer than twelve; though Lamb also gave some public lectures in the evenings, his workload was relatively light. His deftly rendered and original A Treatise on the Mathematical Theory of the Motions of Fluids (which would later be reprinted as Hydrodynamics in 1895) was first published in 1878.

In 1883, Lamb published a paper in the Philosophical Transactions of the Royal Society applying Maxwell's equations to the problem of oscillatory current flow in spherical conductors, an early examination of what was later to be known as the skin effect. Lamb was elected a Fellow of the Royal Society in 1884.

=== University of Manchester, 1885–1920 ===
Lamb was appointed to the Chair of Mathematics at Owens College, Manchester, in 1885 and which became the Beyer Chair in 1888, a position Lamb held until retirement in 1920 (Owens College was merged with the Victoria University of Manchester in 1904). His Hydrodynamics appeared in 1895 (6th ed. 1933), and other works included An Elementary Course of Infinitesimal Calculus (1897, 3rd ed. 1919), Propagation of Tremors over the Surface of an Elastic Solid (1904), The Dynamical Theory of Sound (1910, 2nd ed. 1925), Statics (1912, 3rd ed. 1928), Dynamics (1914), Higher Mechanics (1920) and The Evolution of Mathematical Physics (1924).

=== Later years, 1920–1934 ===
In 1932, Lamb, in an address to the British Association for the Advancement of Science, wittily expressed on the difficulty of explaining and studying turbulence in fluids. He reportedly said, "I am an old man now, and when I die and go to heaven there are two matters on which I hope for enlightenment. One is quantum electrodynamics, and the other is the turbulent motion of fluids. And about the former I am rather optimistic."

Lamb is also known for description of special waves in thin solid layers. These are now known as Lamb waves.

== Family ==
Lamb married Elizabeth Foot (1845−1930), his former headmaster's sister-in-law, in 1875 and had seven children, including the classicist Walter Lamb, the painter Henry Lamb and the archaeologist Dorothy Lamb. His son Ernest, a professor of engineering at Queen Mary College in London, was the father of the climatologist Hubert Lamb and the grandfather of the Liberal Democrat politician Norman Lamb.

Lamb died in 1934 and was buried at the Ascension Parish Burial Ground in Cambridge, with his wife.

== Honours and awards ==
Lamb was elected a Fellow of the Royal Society in 1884, was twice vice-president, received its Royal Medal in 1902 and, its highest honour, the Copley Medal in 1924. He was president of the London Mathematical Society 1902–1904, president of the Manchester Literary and Philosophical Society, and president of the British Association in 1925. He was knighted in 1931. A room in the Alan Turing Building at the University of Manchester is named in his honour and in 2013 the Sir Horace Lamb Chair was created at Manchester. A building at the University of Adelaide also bears his name.

== Publications ==
- Lamb, Horace (1895). Hydrodynamics. Cambridge University Press.
- Lamb, Horace (1910). The Dynamical theory of sound. London Edward Arnold.
- Lamb, Horace (1879). A treatise on the mathematical theory of the motion of fluids. Cambridge University Press.
- Lamb, Horace (1920). Higher mechanics. Cambridge University Press.
- Lamb, Horace (1914). Dynamics. Cambridge University Press.
- Lamb, Horace (1919). An elementary course of infinitesimal calculus. Cambridge University Press.
- Lamb, Horace (1912). Statics, including hydrostatics and the elements of the theory of elasticity. Cambridge University Press.
- Lamb, Horace (1919). The Evolution of Mathematical Physics. At The University Press.

== See also ==
- Lamb (crater)
- Lamb–Oseen vortex

Academic offices
Preceded by Arthur Schuster	Beyer Chair of Applied Mathematics at Victoria University of Manchester; 1888 – 1920	Succeeded by Sydney Chapman
Professional and academic associations
Preceded by James Cosmo Melvill	President of the Manchester Literary and Philosophical Society; 1899–1901	Succeeded by Charles Bailey
