= George Barker Jeffery =

British mathematical physicist (1891–1957)

- Born: 9 May 1891
- Died: 27 April 1957 (aged 65)
- Education: King's College London; University College London
- Known for: Jeffery–Hamel flow
- Spouse: Elizabeth Schofield
- Awards: Fellow of the Royal Society

George Barker Jeffery FRS (9 May 1891 – 27 April 1957) was a leading mathematical physicist in the early twentieth century. He is probably best known to the scientifically literate public as the translator of papers by Albert Einstein, Hendrik Lorentz, and other fathers of relativity theory.

== Career ==
Jeffery was born in 1891 and educated at Strand School, Wilson's School and at King's College London. In 1909 he qualified as a teacher at the London Day Training College and graduated from University College London in 1911. From 1912 to 1921 Jeffery served as Assistant Lecturer in Applied Mathematics at University College, London. He was a research student and assistant of L. N. G. Filon. In 1921 he became University Reader in Mathematics at University College. In 1922 he was appointed Professor of Mathematics at King's College London. In 1924 he returned to University College as Astor Professor of Pure Mathematics (upon the retirement of M. J. M. Hill in 1923).

In 1945 Jeffery was appointed Director of the newly established University of London Institute of Education, where he became interested in the problems of West African education. He also participated actively in the Secondary School Examinations Council, the National Advisory Council on the Training and Supply of Teachers, the New Education Fellowship, the Advisory Council on Education in the Colonies, and the Association of Teachers in Colleges and Departments of Education. He was also a member of the National Foundation for Educational Research. He retired from the Institute in 1957 and died the same year.

== Contributions ==
In 1922 Jeffery published a paper describing the motion of ellipsoidal particles in a viscous fluid and setting out what are now known as Jeffery's equations. In 1923, with W. Perrett, he published what has become the definitive English translation of the seminal papers on relativity by Einstein, Lorenz, Weyl and Minkowski. In connection with this work, he corresponded with Einstein and others. In 1926, together with O. Baldwin, he published a paper presenting the gravitational plane waves, which are widely regarded as one of the most important of all exact solutions of the Einstein field equation in general relativity.

Jeffery was elected as a Fellow of the Royal Society in 1926 and served as Vice-President from 1938 to 1940. He was invited in October 1949 by the British Secretary of State for the Colonies to visit West Africa to study and advise on a "proposal that there should be instituted a West African School Examinations Council". He visited the Gambia, Sierra Leone, Ghana (then called The Gold Coast) and Nigeria from December 1949 to March 1950. His report (since known as the Jeffery Report), published in March 1950, strongly supported the proposal for a West African Examinations Council and made detailed recommendations on the composition and duties of the Council. The recommendations were adopted in full.

== Personal life ==
He was born on 9 May 1891.

In 1916 he married Elizabeth Schofield.

Jeffery was a Quaker, and in 1916 in the First World War spent a short time in prison as a conscientious objector, and further time at the Home Office Work Centre in Wakefield. In 1934 he gave the Swarthmore Lecture to the Yearly Meeting of Quakers, under the title Christ, Yesterday And Today. He died on 27 April 1957.

== See also ==
- Reissner–Nordström metric
