= Beltrami flow =

In fluid dynamics, Beltrami flows are flows in which the vorticity vector $\boldsymbol{\omega}$ and the velocity vector $\mathbf{v}$ are parallel to each other. In other words, Beltrami flow is a flow in which the Lamb vector is zero. It is named after the Italian mathematician Eugenio Beltrami due to his derivation of the Beltrami vector field, while initial developments in fluid dynamics were done by the Russian scientist Ippolit S. Gromeka in 1881.

== Description ==
Since the vorticity vector $\boldsymbol{\omega}$ and the velocity vector $\mathbf{v}$ are colinear to each other, we can write

$$\boldsymbol{\omega}\times\mathbf{v}=0, \quad \boldsymbol{\omega} = \alpha(\mathbf{x},t) \mathbf{v},$$

where $\alpha(\mathbf{x},t)$ is some scalar function. One immediate consequence of Beltrami flow is that it can never be a planar or axisymmetric flow because in those flows, vorticity is always perpendicular to the velocity field. The other important consequence will be realized by looking at the incompressible vorticity equation

$$\frac{\partial \boldsymbol{\omega}}{\partial t} + (\mathbf{v}\cdot\nabla)\boldsymbol{\omega} - (\boldsymbol{\omega}\cdot\nabla) \mathbf{v}= \nu \nabla^2\boldsymbol{\omega} + \nabla\times f,$$

where $\mathbf{f}$ is an external body forces such as gravitational field, electric field etc., and $\nu$ is the kinematic viscosity. Since $\boldsymbol{\omega}$ and $\mathbf{v}$ are parallel, the non-linear terms in the above equation are equal; $(\mathbf{v}\cdot\nabla)\boldsymbol{\omega} =(\boldsymbol{\omega}\cdot\nabla) \mathbf{v}$. Thus Beltrami flows satisfy the linear equations

$$\frac{\partial \boldsymbol{\omega}}{\partial t} = \nu \nabla^2\boldsymbol{\omega} + \nabla\times f.$$

When $\mathbf{f}=0$, the components of vorticity satisfies a simple heat equation.

== Trkalian flow ==
Viktor Trkal considered the Beltrami flows without any external forces in 1919 for the scalar function $\alpha(\mathbf{x},t)=c=\text{constant}$, i.e.,

$$\frac{\partial \boldsymbol{\omega}}{\partial t} = \nu \nabla^2\boldsymbol{\omega}, \quad \boldsymbol{\omega} = c \mathbf{v}.$$

Introduce the following separation of variables

$$\mathbf{v} = e^{-c^2\nu t} \mathbf{g}(\mathbf{x}),$$

then the equation satisfied by $\mathbf{g}(\mathbf{x})$ becomes

$$\nabla \times \mathbf{g} = c\mathbf{g}.$$

The Chandrasekhar–Kendall functions satisfy this equation.

=== Berker's solution ===
Ratip Berker obtained the solution in Cartesian coordinates for $\mathbf{g}(\mathbf{x})$ in 1963,

$$\mathbf{g} = \begin{bmatrix}
-\cos \frac{cx}{\sqrt 2}\,\sin \frac{cy}{\sqrt 2} \\ \sin \frac{cx}{\sqrt 2}\,\cos \frac{cy}{\sqrt 2} \\ \sqrt 2 \cos \frac{cx}{\sqrt 2}\,\cos \frac{cy}{\sqrt 2}
\end{bmatrix}.$$

== Generalized Beltrami flow ==
The generalized Beltrami flow satisfies the condition

$$\nabla\times(\mathbf{v}\times\boldsymbol{\omega})=0$$

which is less restrictive than the Beltrami condition $\mathbf{v}\times\boldsymbol{\omega}=0$. Unlike the normal Beltrami flows, the generalized Beltrami flow can be studied for planar and axisymmetric flows.

=== Steady planar flows ===
For steady generalized Beltrami flow, we have $\nabla^2\boldsymbol{\omega}=0,\ \nabla\times(\mathbf{v}\times\boldsymbol{\omega})=0$ and since it is also planar we have $\mathbf{v}=(u,v,0),\ \boldsymbol{\omega}=(0,0,\zeta)$. Introduce the stream function

$$u = \frac{\partial\psi}{\partial y}, \quad v = -\frac{\partial\psi}{\partial x}, \quad \Rightarrow \quad \nabla^2\psi = - \zeta.$$

Integration of $\nabla\times(\mathbf{v}\times\boldsymbol{\omega})=0$ gives $\zeta=-f(\psi)$. So, complete solution is possible if it satisfies all the following three equations

$$\nabla^2\psi = -\zeta, \quad \nabla^2\zeta =0, \quad \zeta = -f(\psi).$$

A special case is considered when the flow field has uniform vorticity $f(\psi)=C=\text{constant}$. Wang (1991) gave the generalized solution as

$$\zeta = \psi + A(x,y), \quad A(x,y) = ax + by$$

assuming a linear function for $A(x,y)$. Substituting this into the vorticity equation and introducing the separation of variables $\psi(x,y)=X(x)Y(y)$ with the separating constant $\lambda^2$ results in

$$\frac{d^2X}{dx^2} + \frac{b}{\nu} \frac{dX}{dx} - \lambda^2 X =0, \quad \frac{d^2Y}{dy^2} - \frac{a}{\nu} \frac{dY}{dy} + \lambda^2 Y =0.$$

The solution obtained for different choices of $a,\ b,\ \lambda$ can be interpreted differently, for example, $a=0, \ b = -U, \lambda^2>0$ represents a flow downstream a uniform grid, $a=-U, \ b = 0, \lambda^2=0$ represents a flow created by a stretching plate, $a=-U, \ b = U, \lambda^2=0$ represents a flow into a corner, $a=-V, \ b = -U, \lambda^2=0$ represents an Asymptotic suction profile etc.

=== Unsteady planar flows ===
Here,

$$\nabla^2\psi = -\zeta,\quad
\frac{\partial \zeta}{\partial t} = \nabla^2\zeta,\quad
\zeta = - f(\psi, t)$$.

==== Taylor–Walsh eddies ====
A family of exact solutions (due to G. I. Taylor (1923) and Owen Walsh (1992); Walsh's solution is of the form $\mathbf{v}=e^{-\nu\lambda t}\mathbf{u}(x,y)$) is obtained from a separable ansatz in which the whole velocity field decays with a single exponential rate. Let $\mathbf{u}(\mathbf{x})$ be a time-independent field with

$$\nabla^2\mathbf{u}=-\lambda\mathbf{u},\qquad \nabla\cdot\mathbf{u}=0,\qquad \lambda>0 .$$

For $\mathbf{v}=e^{-\nu\lambda t}\mathbf{u}$ one has $\partial_t\mathbf{v}=\nu\nabla^2\mathbf{v}$, so the unsteady and viscous terms cancel exactly and the momentum equation reduces to $e^{-2\nu\lambda t}(\mathbf{u}\cdot\nabla)\mathbf{u}=-\rho^{-1}\nabla p$. Thus $\mathbf{v}$ is an exact solution if and only if

$$(\mathbf{u}\cdot\nabla)\mathbf{u}=\nabla\!\left(\tfrac12|\mathbf{u}|^2\right)-\mathbf{u}\times(\nabla\times\mathbf{u})=-\nabla P$$

is a gradient, and then $p=\rho\,e^{-2\nu\lambda t}P(\mathbf{x})$ (up to a function of time): the pressure decays at twice the rate of the velocity. The eigenvalue condition is linear and easy to satisfy; the gradient condition is the real restriction. It holds, for example, for:

- two-dimensional fields whose vorticity is constant along streamlines, $\zeta=K\psi$ (Taylor's case below);
- Beltrami flows, $\nabla\times\mathbf{u}=\pm\sqrt{\lambda}\,\mathbf{u}$, for which $P=\tfrac12|\mathbf{u}|^2$. These include the unsteady Trkal flow and the unsteady versions of the ABC flow and of the Ethier–Steinman flows.

Not every sum of Laplacian eigenmodes works: modes with different eigenvalues decay at different rates, so the shape of the nonlinear term changes in time and in general it cannot be a gradient at all times. These solutions are examples of the generalized Beltrami flows in the sense of Wang. G. I. Taylor originally treated the two-dimensional special case $\zeta=K\psi$, where $\zeta$ is the vorticity, $\psi$ the stream function and $K$ a constant. The vorticity is then a function of the stream function, so the convective term of the vorticity equation vanishes and the vorticity equation reduces to linear diffusion. He showed that the separation $\psi=e^{-\nu\lambda t}\Psi(x,y)$ satisfies the equation and also $\nabla^2\Psi=-\lambda\Psi$. As an example he considered a decaying system of eddies rotating alternately in opposite directions in a rectangular array,

$$\Psi=A\cos\frac{\pi x}{d}\cos\frac{\pi y}{d},\qquad \lambda=\frac{2\pi^2}{d^2},$$

where $d$ is the side of the square formed by an eddy, so that

$$\psi=A\cos\frac{\pi x}{d}\cos\frac{\pi y}{d}\;e^{-2\pi^2\nu t/d^2}.$$

With $v_x=\partial_y\psi$, $v_y=-\partial_x\psi$ and $k=\pi/d$, the pressure is $p=-\tfrac14\rho A^2k^2\,e^{-4\nu k^2t}\,(\cos 2kx+\cos 2ky)$.

=== Steady axisymmetric flows ===
Here we have $\mathbf{v} = \left(u_r, 0, u_z\right),\ \boldsymbol{\omega} = (0, \zeta,0)$. Integration of $\nabla\times(\mathbf{v}\times\boldsymbol{\omega}) = 0$ gives $\zeta = rf(\psi)$ and the three equations are

$$\frac{\partial}{\partial r} \left(\frac{1}{r} \frac{\partial \psi}{\partial z}\right) + \frac{1}{r} \frac{\partial^2 \psi}{\partial z^2} = -\zeta, \quad \nabla^2\zeta = 0, \quad \zeta = rf(\psi)$$

The first equation is the Hicks equation. Marris and Aswani (1977) showed that the only possible solution is $f(\psi)=C=\text{constant}$ and the remaining equations reduce to

$$\frac{\partial^2 \psi}{\partial r^2} - \frac{1}{r} \frac{\partial \psi}{\partial r} + \frac{\partial^2 \psi}{\partial z^2}   + C r^2 =0$$

A simple set of solutions to the above equation is

$$\psi(r, z) = c_1 r^4 + c_2 r^2 z^2 + c_3 r^2 + c_4 r^2 z + c_5 \left(r^6 - 12r^4 z^2 + 8r^2 z^4\right), \quad C = -\left(8c_1 + 2c_2\right)$$

$c_1, c_4 \neq 0,\ c_2, c_3, c_5 = 0$ represents a flow due to two opposing rotational stream on a parabolic surface, $c_2 \neq 0, c_1, c_3, c_4, c_5 = 0$ represents rotational flow on a plane wall, $c_1, c_2, c_3 \neq 0,\ c_4, c_5 = 0$ represents a flow ellipsoidal vortex (special case – Hill's spherical vortex), $c_1, c_3, c_5 \neq 0,\ c_2, c_4 = 0$ represents a type of toroidal vortex etc.

The homogeneous solution for $C=0$ as shown by Berker

$$\psi = r\left[A_k J_1(kr) + B_k Y_1(kr)\right]\left(C_k e^{kz} + D_k e^{-kz}\right)$$

where $J_1(kr), Y_1(kr)$ are the Bessel function of the first kind and Bessel function of the second kind respectively. A special case of the above solution is Poiseuille flow for cylindrical geometry with transpiration velocities on the walls. Chia-Shun Yih found a solution in 1958 for Poiseuille flow into a sink when $C = 2,\, c_1 = -1/4,\, c_3 = 1/2,\, c_2 = c_4 = c_5 = B_k = C_k = 0$.

== Beltrami flow in fluid mechanics ==
Beltrami fields are a classical steady solution to the Euler equation. Beltrami fields play an important role in (ideal) fluid mechanics in equilibrium, as complexity is only expected for these fields.

== See also ==
- Gromeka–Arnold–Beltrami–Childress (GABC) flow
