= Taylor–Culick flow =

In fluid dynamics, Taylor–Culick flow, a type of a stagnation point flow, describes the axisymmetric flow inside a long slender cylinder with one end closed, supplied by a constant flow injection through the sidewall. The flow is named after Geoffrey Ingram Taylor and F. E. C. Culick. In 1956, Taylor showed that when a fluid forced into porous sheet of cone or wedge, a favorable longitudinal pressure gradient is set up in the direction of the flow inside the cone or wedge and the flow is rotational; this is in contrast in the vice versa case wherein the fluid is forced out of the cone or wedge sheet from inside in which case, the flow is uniform inside the cone or wedge and is obviously potential. Taylor also obtained solutions for the velocity in the limiting case where the cone or the wedge degenerates into a circular tube or parallel plates. Later in 1966, Culick found the solution corresponding to the tube problem, in problem applied to solid-propellant rocket combustion. Here the thermal expansion of the gas due to combustion occurring at the inner surface of the combustion chamber (long slender cylinder) generates a flow directed towards the axis.

== Flow description ==
Consider a slender porous tube of radius $a$ and length $l$ (such that $\epsilon=a/l\ll 1$) through which fluid is injected uniformly with a speed $V$. Far away from the open or closed ends, the radial velocity and axial velocity induced is of the order $v_r\sim V$ and $v\sim V/\epsilon$ and the flow can be described using self-similar solution, which was described for laminar, viscous flows by S. W. Yuan and A. Finkelstein, following the earlier work for planar flows (or Berman flow). When the Reynolds number $Re=Va/\nu$ becomes large, the solution approaches the Taylor–Culick flow, which is described by
$$\frac{v_r}{V}=-\frac{a}{r} \sin \left(\frac{\pi r^2}{2 a^2}\right), \quad v_\theta=0, \quad \frac{v_z}{V/\epsilon}= \frac{\pi z}{l} \cos \left(\frac{\pi r^2}{2 a^2}\right).$$

The pressure field and Stokes stream function are given by
$$\frac{p-p_0}{\rho V^2 /\epsilon^2} = -\frac{\pi}{2}\frac{z^2}{l^2} -  \epsilon^2 \frac{v_r^2}{2V^2}, \quad \frac{\psi}{Vla} = \frac{z}{l} \sin \left(\frac{\pi r^2}{2 a^2}\right).$$

Despite the simple-looking formula, the solution has been experimentally verified to be accurate. If the tube has a closed end at $z=0$, then the self-similar solution is wrong for distances of order $z\sim a$ since boundary layer separation at $z=0$ is inevitable; that is, the Taylor–Culick profile is correct for $z\gg 1$. The Taylor–Culick profile with injection at the closed end of the cylinder can also be solved analytically.

Although the solution is derived for the inviscid equation, it satisfies the non-slip condition at the wall since, as Taylor argued, any boundary layer at the sidewall will be blown off by flow injection. Hence, the flow is referred to as quasi-viscous.

== See also ==
- Berman flow
