= Gamma-Re Transition Model =

Mathematical equations to describe fluid flow

Gamma-Re (γ-Re) transition model is a two equation model used in Computational Fluid Dynamics (CFD) to modify turbulent transport equations to simulate laminar, laminar-to-turbulent and turbulence states in a fluid flow. The Gamma-Re model does not intend to model the physics of the problem but attempts to fit a wide range of experiments and transition methods into its formulation. The transition model calculated an intermittency factor that creates (or extinguishes) turbulence by slowly introducing turbulent production at the laminar-to-turbulent transition location.

Intermittency Value on a Turbomachinery blade

== Principle ==
The goal of developing the gamma-Re ($\gamma - \mathrm{Re}_{\theta_t}$) transition model was to develop a transition model based on local variables which could be easily implemented into modern CFD code with unstructured grids and massive parallel execution. The majority of earlier transition models such as the $e^{n}$ model needs to know the structure of the boundary layer and the integration along it; both concepts are hard to implement in three dimensions along many subdivisions of a grid. Another key insight to the formulation of this model is that the Reynolds vorticity number can be related to the Reynolds transition onset number so there is a local way to determine the transition location. The gamma-Re transition model has two equations and is based on the two-equation turbulence models in the context of turbulence modeling. This way both local and global trends can be modelled. The intermittency or gamma determines the percentage of time the flow is turbulent (0 = fully laminar, 1 = fully turbulent). The intermittency acts on the production term of the turbulent kinetic energy transport equation in the SST model to simulate laminar/turbulence flows.

== Standard Gamma-Theta model ==
For intermittency $\gamma$

$$\frac{ \partial (\rho \gamma) }{\partial t} + \frac{\partial(\rho U_j \gamma)}{ \partial x_j} = P_{\gamma} - E_{\gamma} + \frac{\partial}{\partial x_j}\left[\left(\mu+\frac{\mu_f}{\sigma_f}\right)\frac{\partial \gamma}{\partial x_j} \right]$$

For Transition Momentum Thickness Reynolds Number $Re_{\theta}$

$$\frac{ \partial (\rho \overline{Re_{\theta t}}) }{\partial t} + \frac{\partial(\rho U_j  \overline{Re_{\theta t}})}{ \partial x_j} = P_{\theta t} + \frac{\partial}{\partial x_j}\left[\sigma_{\theta t}(\mu + \mu_t )\frac{\partial \overline{Re_{\theta t}}}{\partial x_j} \right]$$

== Applications ==
The present model was appropriate for the prediction of an expansion swirl flow.

== Other models ==
Following are some more models which are usually employed.

en low-Reynolds Number
