= Schneider flow =

Schneider flow describes the axisymmetric outer flow induced by a laminar or turbulent jet having a large jet Reynolds number or by a laminar plume with a large Grashof number, in the case where the fluid domain is bounded by a wall. When the jet Reynolds number or the plume Grashof number is large, the full flow field constitutes two regions of different extent: a thin boundary-layer flow that may identified as the jet or as the plume and a slowly moving fluid in the large outer region encompassing the jet or the plume. The Schneider flow describing the latter motion is an exact solution of the Navier-Stokes equations, discovered by Wilhelm Schneider in 1981. The solution was discovered also by A. A. Golubinskii and V. V. Sychev in 1979, however, was never applied to flows entrained by jets. The solution is an extension of Taylor's potential flow solution to arbitrary Reynolds number.

== Mathematical description ==
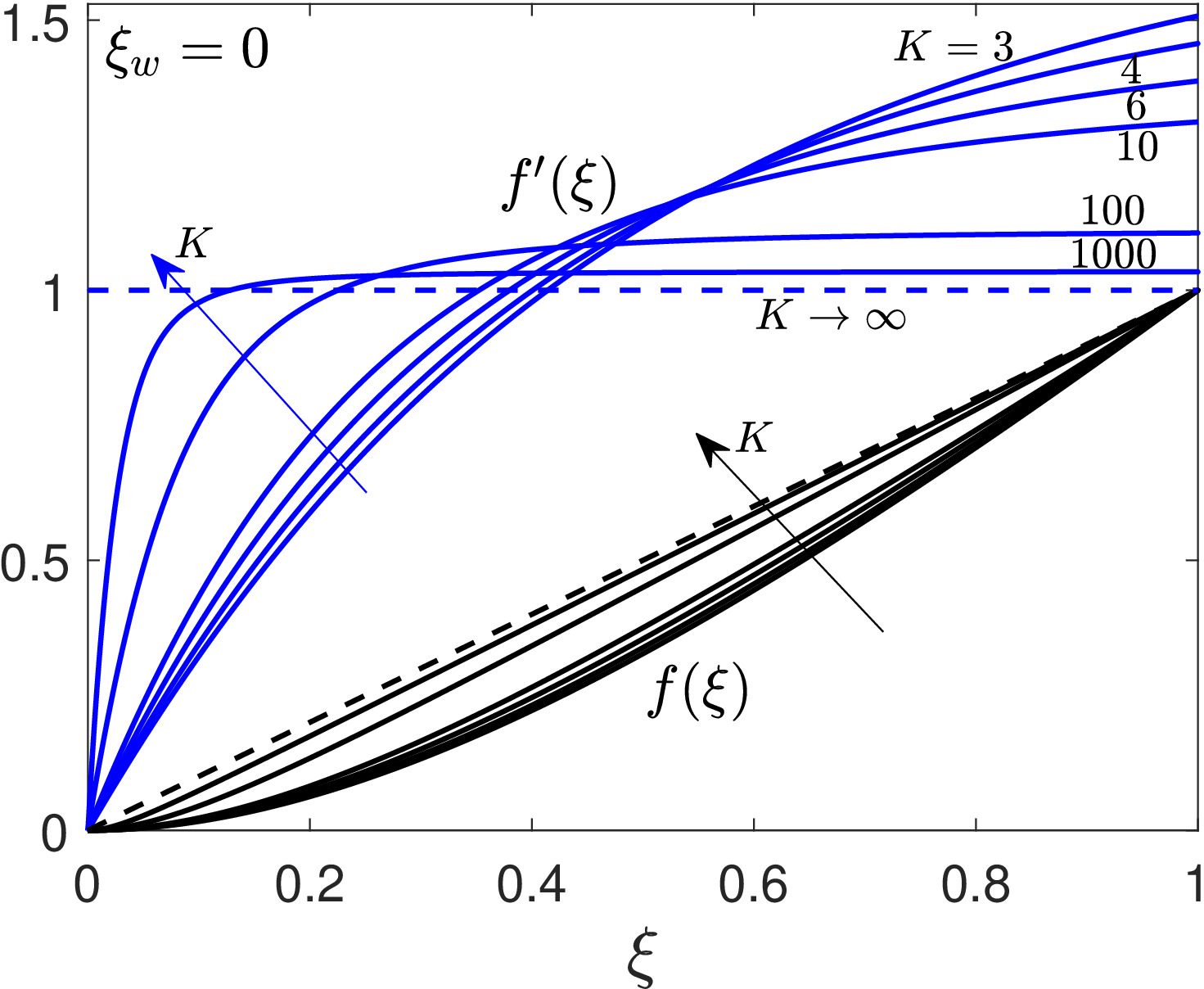
Schneider flow: Numerical solution of the function $f(\xi)$ (black lines) and $f'(\xi)$ (blue lines) for various values of $K$ and $\xi_w=0$ ($\alpha=\pi/2$). Dashed lines correspond to the Taylor's solution $f(\xi)=\xi$.

For laminar or turbulent jets and for laminar plumes, the volumetric entertainment rate per unit axial length is constant as can be seen from the solution of Schlichting jet and Yih plume. Thus, the jet or plume can be considered as a line sink that drives the motion in the outer region, as was first done by G. I. Taylor. Prior to Schneider, it was assumed that this outer fluid motion is also a large Reynolds number flow, hence the outer fluid motion is assumed to be a potential flow solution, which was solved by G. I. Taylor in 1958. For turbulent plume, the entrainment is not constant, nevertheless, the outer fluid is still governed by Taylors solution.

Though Taylor's solution is still true for turbulent jet, for laminar jet or laminar plume, the effective Reynolds number for outer fluid is found to be of order unity since the entertainment by the sink in these cases is such that the flow is not inviscid. In this case, full Navier-Stokes equations has to be solved for the outer fluid motion and at the same time, since the fluid is bounded from the bottom by a solid wall, the solution has to satisfy the non-slip condition. Schneider obtained a self-similar solution for this outer fluid motion, which naturally reduced to Taylor's potential flow solution as the entrainment rate by the line sink is increased.

Suppose a conical wall of semi-angle $\alpha$ with polar axis along the cone-axis and assume the vertex of the solid cone sits at the origin of the spherical coordinates $(r,\theta,\phi)$ extending along the negative axis. Now, put the line sink along the positive side of the polar axis. Set this way, $\alpha=\pi/2$ represents the common case of flat wall with jet or plume emerging from the origin. The case $\alpha=\pi$ corresponds to jet/plume issuing from a thin injector. The flow is axisymmetric with zero azimuthal motion, i.e., the velocity components are $(v_r,v_\theta,0)$. The usual technique to study the flow is to introduce the Stokes stream function $\psi$ such that

$$v_r = \frac{1}{r^2\sin\theta}\frac{\partial\psi}{\partial\theta}, \quad v_\theta = - \frac{1}{r\sin\theta}\frac{\partial\psi}{\partial r}.$$

Introducing $\xi =\cos\theta$ as the replacement for $\theta$ and introducing the self-similar form $\psi = K\nu r f(\xi)$ into the axisymmetric Navier-Stokes equations, we obtain

$$K^{-1}[(1-\xi^2)f'''' - 4\xi f'''] - ff''' - 3f'f'' = 0.$$

where the constant $K$ is such that the volumetric entrainment rate per unit axial length is equal to $2\pi K\nu$. For laminar jet, $K=4$ and for laminar plume, it depends on the Prandtl number $Pr$, for example with $Pr=1$, we have $K=6$ and with $Pr=2$, we have $K=4$. For turbulent jet, this constant is the order of the jet Reynolds number, which is a large number.

The above equation can easily be reduced to a Riccati equation by integrating thrice, a procedure that is same as in the Landau–Squire jet (main difference between Landau-Squire jet and the current problem are the boundary conditions). The boundary conditions on the conical wall $\xi=\xi_w=\cos\alpha$ become

$$f(\xi_w)=f'(\xi_w)=0$$

and along the line sink $\xi=1$, we have

$$f(1)=1, \quad \lim_{\xi\rightarrow 1} (1-\xi)^{1/2} f''\rightarrow 0.$$

The problem has been solved numerically from here. The numerical solution also provides the values $f'(1)$ (the radial velocity at the axis), which must be accounted in the first-order boundary analysis of the inner jet problem at the axis.

=== Taylor's potential flow ===
For turbulent jet, $K\gg 1$, the linear terms in the equation can be neglected everywhere except near a small boundary layer along the wall. Then neglecting the non-slip conditions ($f'(\xi_w)=0$) at the wall, the solution, which was provided by G. I. Taylor in 1958, is given by

$$f= \frac{\xi-\xi_w}{1-\xi_w}.$$

In the case of axisymmetric turbulent plumes where the entrainment rate per unit axial length of the plume increases like $r^{2/3}$, Taylor's solution is given by $\psi = C B^{1/3} r^{5/3}g(\xi)$ where $C$ is a constant, $B$ is the specific buoyancy flux and

$$g=\frac{\pi}{\sqrt 3} \sqrt{1-\xi^2}\left[\frac{P_{2/3}^1(-\xi_w)}{P_{2/3}^1(\xi_w)}P_{2/3}^1(\xi)-P_{2/3}^1(-\xi)\right]$$

in which $P_{2/3}^1$ denotes the associated Legendre function of the first kind with degree $2/3$ and order $1$.

== Composite solution for laminar jets and plumes ==
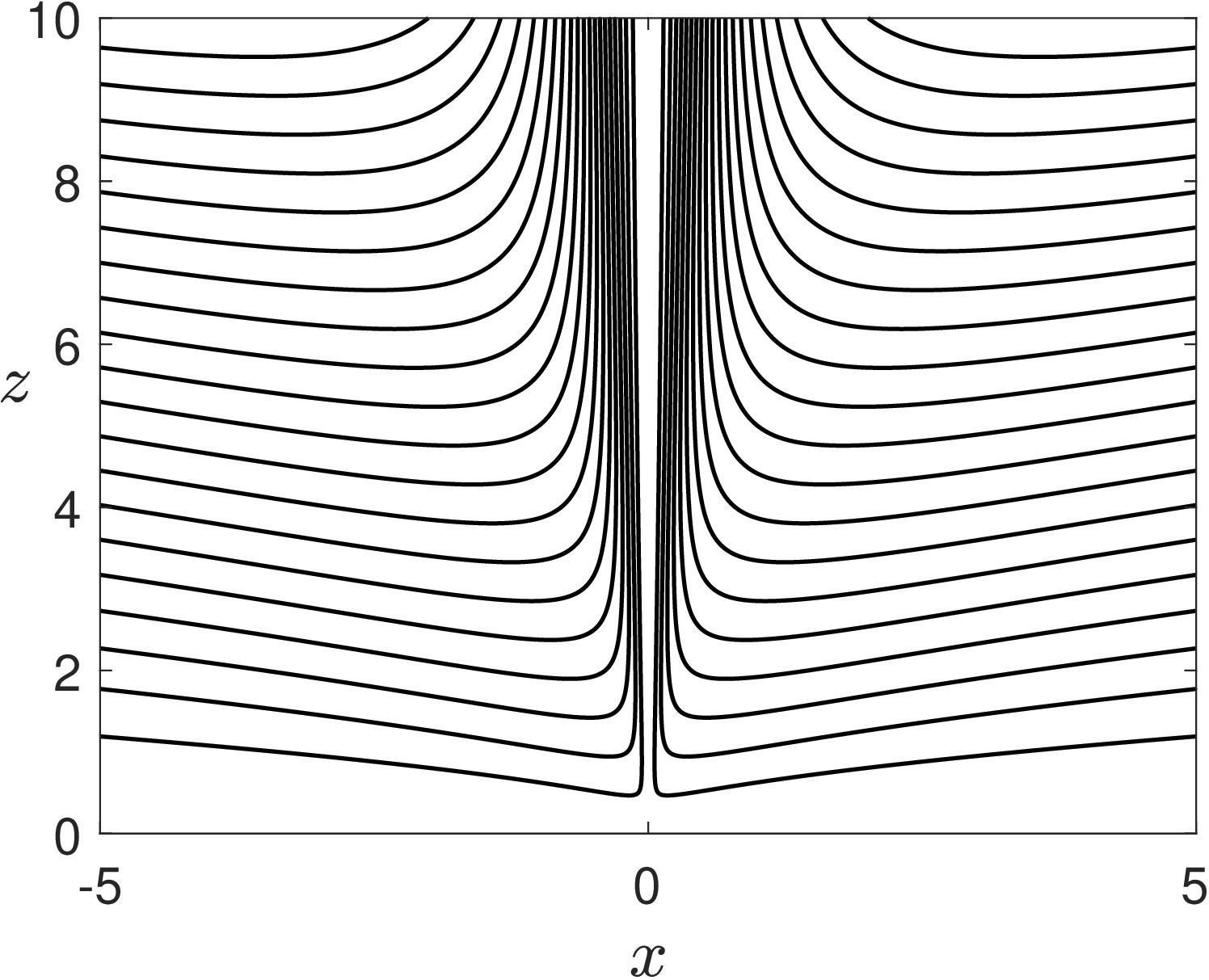
Equi-spaced contours of $\psi/\nu$ of the composite expansion, projected onto the $y=0$-plane, for the laminar jet with $Re=50$ and $\alpha=\pi/2$.

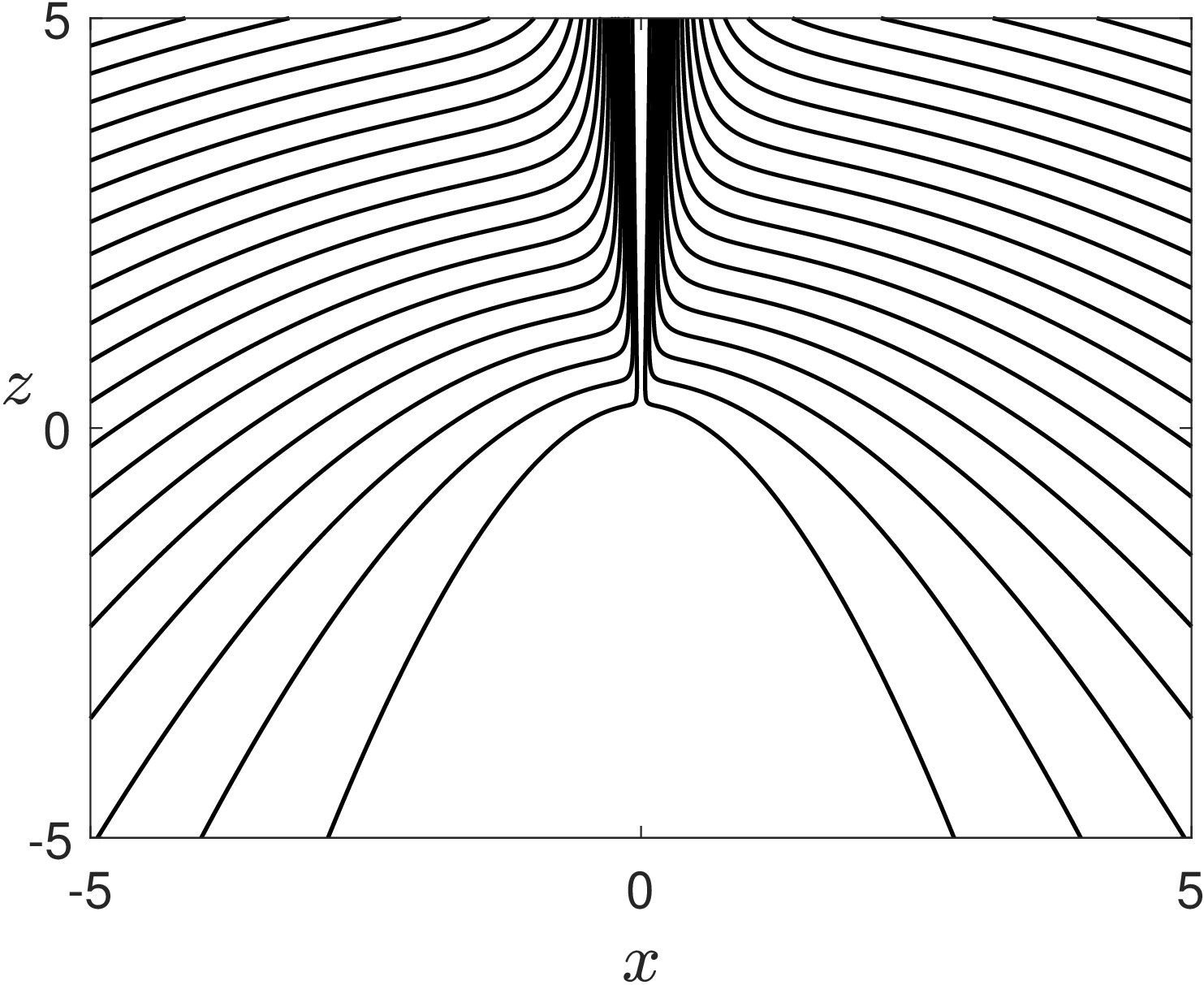
Equi-spaced contours of $\psi/\nu$ of the composite expansion, projected onto the $y=0$-plane, for the laminar jet with $Re=50$ and $\alpha\to\pi$.

The Schneider flow describes the outer motion driven by the jets or plumes and it becomes invalid in a thin region encompassing the axis where the jet or plume resides. For laminrar jets, the inner solution is described by the Schlichting jet and for laminar plumes, the inner solution is prescribed by Yih plume. A composite solution by stitching the inner thin Schlichting solution and the outer Schneider solution can be constructed by the method of matched asymptotic expansions. For the laminar jet, the composite solution is given by

$$\psi = 4\nu r\left[\frac{(Re\, \theta)^2}{32/3+ (Re\, \theta)^2}+ f(\cos\theta) -1\right]$$

in which the first term respresents the Schlichting jet (with a characteristic jet thickness $Re\,\theta$), the second term represents the Schneider flow and the third term is the subtraction of the matching conditions. Here $Re= \nu^{-1}(J/2\pi \rho)^{1/2}$ is the Reynolds number of the jet and $J/\rho$ is the kinematic momentum flux of the jet.

A similar composite solution can be constructed for the laminar plumes.

== Other considerations ==
The exact solution of the Navier-Stokes solutions was verified experimentally by Zauner in 1985. Further analysis showed that the axial momentum flux decays slowly along the axis unlike the Schlichting jet solution and it is found that the Schneider flow becomes invalid when distance from the origin increases to a distance of the order exponential of square of the jet Reynolds number, thus the domain of validity of Schneider solution increases with increasing jet Reynolds number.

== Presence of swirl ==
The presence of swirling motion, i.e., $v_\phi\neq 0$ is shown not to influence the axial motion given by $\psi=K\nu r f(\xi)$ provided $K\sim O(1)$. If $K$ is very large, the presence of swirl completely alters the motion on the axial plane. For $K\sim O(1)$, the azimuthal solution can be solved in terms of the circulation $2\pi \Gamma$, where $\Gamma=r\sin\theta v_\phi$. The solution can be described in terms of the self-similar solution of the second kind, $\Gamma=Ar^\lambda \Lambda(\xi)$, where $A$ is an unknown constant and $\lambda$ is an eigenvalue. The function $\Lambda(\xi)$ satisfies

$$K^{-1}[(1-\xi^2)\Lambda''+\lambda(\lambda-1)\Lambda]-f\Lambda'+\lambda f'\Lambda =0$$

subjected to the boundary conditions $\Lambda(\xi_w)=0$ and $(1-\xi)^{1/2}\Lambda'\rightarrow 0$ as $\xi\rightarrow 1$.

== See also ==
- Landau–Squire jet
- Schlichting jet
