= Herbert Squire =

British aerospace engineer (1909–1961)

Professor Herbert Squire
- Born: 13 July 1909
- Died: 22 November 1961 (aged 52)
- Education: Bedford School, Balliol College, Oxford
- Known for: Landau–Squire jet Squire–Long equation Squire's theorem
- Scientific career
- Fields: Aerospace Engineering
- Workplaces: Imperial College London

Herbert Brian Squire FRS (13 July 1909 – 22 November 1961), was a British aerospace engineer and Zaharoff Professor of Aviation at Imperial College London.

== Biography ==
Born on 13 July 1909, Squire was educated at Bedford School and at Balliol College, Oxford, where he read mathematics. After research at the University of Oxford, and at the University of Göttingen between 1932 and 1933, he became a scientific officer at the Royal Aircraft Establishment. In 1946 he was appointed as chairman of the Helicopter Committee of the Aeronautics Research Council and, in 1947, he was appointed as principal scientific officer at the Royal Aircraft Establishment, working on jet propulsion. Between 1952 and 1961 he was Zaharoff Professor of Aviation at Imperial College London. He was elected as a Fellow of the Royal Society in 1957.

Squire died on 22 November 1961.
