= Walter Tollmien =

German fluid dynamicist

Walter Tollmien (13 October 1900, in Berlin – 25 November 1968, in Göttingen) was a German fluid dynamicist.

== Life ==
Walter Tollmien studied mathematics and physics for the winter semester in 1920–1921 with Ludwig Prandtl in Göttingen and then from 1924 onwards worked under Prandtl at the Kaiser Wilhelm Institute. After some research in Germany, he went to the United States and stayed there between 1930 and 1933. He became a professor in 1937 at Technische Hochschule Dresden. In 1957, he took over the post of director at the Max-Planck Institute for fluid mechanics research.

== Achievements ==
Through his pioneering work as a researcher and a teacher, Walter Tollmien brought fluid mechanics into the lime light and as an inter disciplinary science of extreme importance. He theoretically demonstrated that the transition from laminar flow to turbulence results in Tollmien–Schlichting waves, which were named after him and Hermann Schlichting.

== Work ==
- Tollmien, Walter (1929): Über die Entstehung der Turbulenz. 1. Mitteilung, Nachr. Ges. Wiss. Göttingen, Math. Phys. Klasse 1929: 21ff
- Tollmien, Walter (1931): Grenzschichttheorie, in: Handbuch der Experimentalphysik IV,1, Leipzig, S. 239–287.
