= Tollmien–Schlichting wave =

Streamwise unstable wave

In fluid dynamics, a Tollmien–Schlichting wave (often abbreviated T-S wave) is a streamwise unstable wave which arises in a bounded shear flow (such as boundary layer and channel flow). It is one of the more common methods by which a laminar bounded shear flow transitions to turbulence. The waves are initiated when some disturbance (sound, for example) interacts with leading edge roughness in a process known as receptivity. These waves are slowly amplified as they move downstream until they may eventually grow large enough that nonlinearities take over and the flow transitions to turbulence.

These waves, originally discovered by Ludwig Prandtl, were further studied by two of his former students, Walter Tollmien and Hermann Schlichting after whom the phenomenon is named.

Also, the T-S wave is defined as the most unstable eigen-mode of Orr–Sommerfeld equations.

== Physical mechanism ==
In order for a boundary layer to be absolutely unstable (have an inviscid instability), it must satisfy Rayleigh's criterion; namely

$$D^{2}U = 0$$

where $D$ represents the y-derivative and $U$ is the free stream velocity profile. In other words, the velocity profile must have an inflection point to be unstable.

It is clear that in a typical boundary layer with a zero pressure gradient, the flow will be unconditionally stable; however, we know from experience this is not the case and the flow does transition. It is clear, then, that viscosity must be an important factor in the instability. It can be shown using energy methods that

$$\frac{DE}{Dt} = -\int_{V}u'v'\left(\frac{dU}{dy}\right)-\frac{1}{R}\int_{V}\left( \nabla \vec{v}'\right)^{2}$$

The rightmost term is a viscous dissipation term and is stabilizing. The left term, however, is the Reynolds stress term and is the primary production method for instability growth. In an inviscid flow, the $u'$ and $v'$ terms are orthogonal, so the term is zero, as one would expect. However, with the addition of viscosity, the two components are no longer orthogonal and the term becomes nonzero. In this regard, viscosity is destabilizing and is the reason for the formation of T-S waves.

== Transition phenomena ==
=== Initial disturbance ===
In a laminar boundary layer, if the initial disturbance spectrum is nearly infinitesimal and random (with no discrete frequency peaks), the initial instability will occur as two-dimensional Tollmien–Schlichting waves, travelling in the mean flow direction if compressibility is not important. However, three-dimensionality soon appears as the Tollmien–Schlichting waves rather quickly begin to show variations. There are known to be many paths from Tollmien–Schlichting waves to turbulence, and many of them are explained by the non-linear theories of flow instability.

=== Final transition ===
A shear layer develops viscous instability and forms Tollmien–Schlichting waves which grow, while still laminar, into finite amplitude (1 to 2 percent of the freestream velocity) three-dimensional fluctuations in velocity and pressure to develop three-dimensional unstable waves and hairpin eddies. From then on, the process is more a breakdown than a growth. The longitudinally stretched vortices begin a cascading breakdown into smaller units, until the relevant frequencies and wave numbers are approaching randomness. Then in this diffusively fluctuating state, intense local changes occur at random times and locations in the shear layer near the wall. At the locally intense fluctuations, turbulent 'spots' are formed that burst forth in the form of growing and spreading spots — the result of which is a fully turbulent state downstream.

==== The simple harmonic transverse sound of Tollmien–Schlichting (T-S) waves ====
Tollmien (1931) and Schlichting (1929) theorized that viscosity-induced grabbing and releasing of laminae created long-crested simple harmonic (SH) oscillations (vibrations) along a smooth flat boundary, at a flow rate approaching the onset of turbulence. These T-S waves would gradually increase in amplitude until they broke up into the vortices, noise and high resistance that characterize turbulent flow. Contemporary wind tunnels failed to show T-S waves.

In 1943, Schubauer and Skramstad (S and S) created a wind tunnel that went to extremes to damp mechanical vibrations and sounds that might affect the airflow studies along a smooth flat plate. Using a vertical array of evenly spaced hot wire anemometers in the boundary layer (BL) airflow, they substantiated the existence of T-S oscillations by showing SH velocity fluctuations in the BL laminae. The T-S waves gradually increased in amplitude until a few random spikes of in-phase amplitude appeared, triggering focal vortices (turbulent spots), with noise. A further increase in flow rate resulted suddenly in many vortices, aerodynamic noise and a great increase in resistance to flow. An oscillation of a mass in a fluid creates a sound wave; SH oscillations of a mass of fluid, flowing in that same fluid along a boundary, must result in SH sound, reflected off the boundary, transversely into the fluid.

S and S found foci of in-phase spiking amplitude in the T-S waves; these must create bursts of high amplitude sound, with high energy oscillation of fluid molecules transversely through the BL laminae. This has the potential to freeze laminar slip (laminar interlocking) in these spots, transferring the resistance to the boundary: this breaking at the boundary could rip out pieces of T-S long-crested waves which would tumble head-over-heels downstream in the boundary layer as the vortices of turbulent spots. With further increase in flow rate, there is an explosion into turbulence, with many random vortices and the noise of aerodynamic sound.

Schubauer and Skramstad overlooked the significance of the co-generation of transverse SH sound by the T-S waves in transition and turbulence. However, John Tyndall (1867) in his transition-to-turbulence flow studies using flames, deduced that SH waves were created during transition by viscosity acting around the walls of a tube and these could be amplified by blending with similar SH sound waves (from a whistle), triggering turbulence at lower flow rates. Schubauer and Skramstad introduced SH sound into the boundary layer by creating SH fluttering vibrations of a BL ferromagnetic ribbon in their 1941 experiments, similarly triggering turbulence at lower flow rates.

Tyndall’s contribution towards explaining the mystery of transition to turbulence 150 years ago is beginning to gain recognition.
