= Hermann Schlichting =

German fluid dynamics engineer

- Born: 22 September 1907; Balje/Elbe, German Empire
- Died: 15 June 1982 (aged 74); Göttingen, West Germany
- Education: University of Göttingen
- Known for: Schlichting jet Tollmien–Schlichting wave Boundary layer transition
- Awards: Bundesverdienstkreuz
- Scientific career
- Fields: Fluid dynamics
- Workplaces: Technische Universität Braunschweig; Kaiser Wilhelm Institute for Flow Research
- Thesis: About the plane wind shadow problem (1930)
- Doctoral advisor: Ludwig Prandtl; Albert Betz

Hermann Schlichting (22 September 1907 – 15 June 1982) was a German fluid dynamics engineer.

== Life and work ==
Hermann Schlichting studied from 1926 till 1930 mathematics, physics and applied mechanics at the University of Jena, Vienne and Göttingen. In 1930 he wrote his PhD in Göttingen titled Über das ebene Windschattenproblem and also in the same year passed the state examination as teacher for higher mathematics and physics. His meeting with Ludwig Prandtl had a long-lasting effect on him. He worked from 1931 till 1935 at the Kaiser Wilhelm Institute for Flow Research in Göttingen. His main research area was fluid flows with viscous effects. Simultaneously he also started working on airfoil aerodynamics. In 1935 Schlichting went to Dornier in Friedrichshafen. There he did the planning for the new wind tunnel and after short construction time took charge over it. With it he gained useful experience in the field of aerodynamics. At the age of 30 in 1937 he joined Technische Universität Braunschweig, where in 1938 he became a professor.

After joining in October 1937 Schlichting worked on setting up the Aerodynamic Institute at the Braunschweig-Waggum airport.

Some features of a boundary layer transitioning from a laminar to turbulent state has been named after him, the Tollmien–Schlichting waves.

Prof. Schlichting became an emeritus professor on 30 September 1975 at TU Braunschweig.

== Achievements ==
- 1953 Medal "50th Anniversary of Powered Flight“ from National Aeronautical Association, Washington D.C.
- 1968 Dr.-Ing. E.h. at the Technical University of Munich
- 1969 Ludwig-Prandtl-Ring from Deutschen Gesellschaft für Luft- und Raumfahrt (DGLR)
- 1972 Bundesverdienstkreuz
- 1976 Honorary member of Deutschen Forschungs- und Versuchsanstalt für Luft- und Raumfahrt e.V. (DFVLR)
- 1980 "Von-Kármán-Medaille“ from Advisory Group for Aerospace Research and Development (AGARD), Paris

== Books ==
- Hermann Schlichting, Erich Truckenbrodt: Aerodynamik des Flugzeugs Springer, Berlin 1967
- Hermann Schlichting, Klaus Gersten, Boundary Layer Theory, 8th ed. Springer-Verlag 2004, ISBN 81-8128-121-7
- Hermann Schlichting, Klaus Gersten, Egon Krause, Herbert, jun. Oertel: Grenzschicht-Theorie Springer, Berlin 2006, ISBN 3-540-23004-1

Preceded by Albert Betz	Director of Aerodynamic Laboratory, University of Göttingen; 1956—1975	Succeeded by Boris Laschka
