= Blast wave =

Increased fluid pressure and flow from an explosion

In fluid dynamics, a blast wave is the increased pressure and flow resulting from the deposition of a large amount of energy in a small, very localised volume. The flow field can be approximated as a lead shock wave, followed by a similar subsonic flow field. In simpler terms, a blast wave is an area of pressure expanding supersonically outward from an explosive core. It has a leading shock front of compressed gases. The blast wave is followed by a blast wind of negative gauge pressure, which sucks items back in towards the center. The blast wave is harmful especially to objects very close to the center or at a location of constructive interference. High explosives that detonate generate blast waves.

== Sources ==
High-order explosives (HE) are more powerful than low-order explosives (LE). HE detonate to produce a defining supersonic over-pressurization shock wave. Sources of HE include trinitrotoluene (TNT), C-4, Semtex, nitroglycerin, and ammonium nitrate fuel oil (ANFO). LE deflagrate to create a subsonic explosion and lack HE's over-pressurization wave. Sources of LE include pipe bombs, gunpowder, and most pure petroleum-based incendiary bombs such as Molotov cocktails or aircraft improvised as guided missiles. HE and LE induce different injury patterns. Only HE produce true blast waves.

== History ==
The classic flow solution—the so-called Taylor–von Neumann–Sedov blast wave solution—was independently devised by John von Neumann and British mathematician Geoffrey Ingram Taylor during World War II. After the war, the similarity solution was published by three other authors—L. I. Sedov, R. Latter, and J. Lockwood-Taylor—who had discovered it independently. Since the early theoretical work, both theoretical and experimental studies of blast waves have been ongoing.

== Characteristics and properties ==
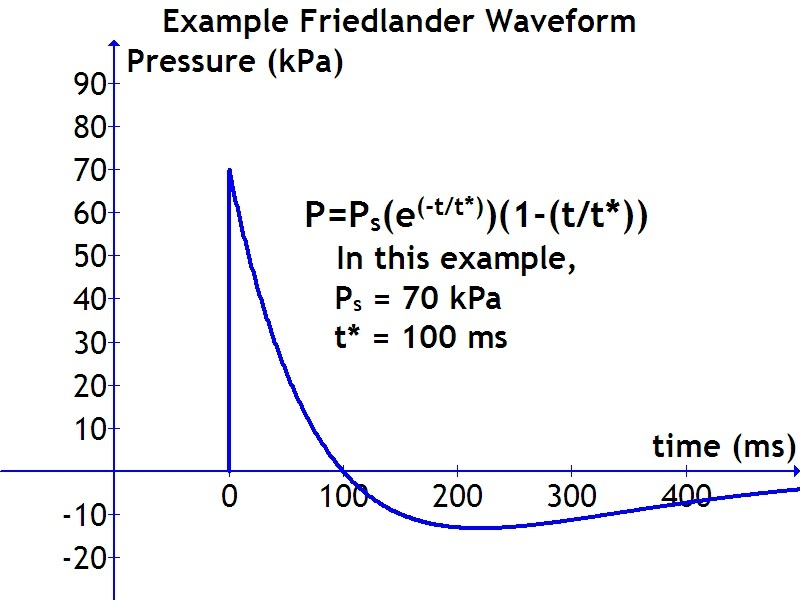
A Friedlander waveform is the simplest form of a blast wave.

The simplest form of a blast wave has been described and termed the Friedlander waveform. It occurs when a high explosive detonates in a free field: that is, with no surfaces nearby with which it can interact. Blast waves have properties predicted by the physics of waves. For example, they can diffract through a narrow opening and refract as they pass through materials. Like light or sound waves, when a blast wave reaches a boundary between two materials, part of it is transmitted, part of it is absorbed, and part of it is reflected. The impedances of the two materials determine how much of each occurs.

The equation for a Friedlander waveform describes the pressure of the blast wave as a function of time:

$$P(t)=P_se^{-\frac{t}{t^*}}\left(1-\frac{t}{t^*}\right).$$

where P_{s} is the peak pressure and t* is the time at which the pressure first crosses the horizontal axis (before the negative phase).

Blast waves will wrap around objects and buildings. Therefore, persons or objects behind a large building are not necessarily protected from a blast that starts on the opposite side of the building. Scientists use sophisticated mathematical models to predict how objects will respond to a blast in order to design effective barriers and safer buildings.

=== Mach stem formation ===
A blast wave reflecting from a surface and forming a mach stem. The picture shows a 20 kiloton air burst at 540 meters, to optimize the area covered by at least 15 psi blast damage.

Mach stem formation occurs when a blast wave reflects off the ground and the reflection catches up with the original shock front, therefore creating a high pressure zone that extends from the ground up to a certain point called the triple point at the edge of the blast wave. Anything in this area experiences peak pressures that can be several times higher than the peak pressure of the original shock front.

=== Constructive and destructive interference ===
An example of constructive interference.

In physics, interference is the meeting of two correlated waves and either increasing or lowering the net amplitude, depending on whether it is constructive or destructive interference. If a crest of a wave meets a crest of another wave at the same point then the crests interfere constructively and the resultant crest wave amplitude is increased, forming a much more powerful wave than either of the beginning waves. Similarly two troughs make a trough of increased amplitude. If a crest of a wave meets a trough of another wave then they interfere destructively, and the overall amplitude is decreased, thus making a wave that is much smaller than either of the parent waves.

The formation of a mach stem is one example of constructive interference. Whenever a blast wave reflects off of a surface, such as a building wall or the inside of a vehicle, different reflected waves can interact with each other to cause an increase in pressure at a certain point (constructive interference) or a decrease (destructive interference). In this way the interaction of blast waves is similar to that of sound waves or water waves.

== Damage ==
Blast waves cause damage by a combination of the significant compression of the air in front of the wave (forming a shock front) and the subsequent wind that follows. A blast wave travels faster than the speed of sound, and the passage of the shock wave usually lasts only a few milliseconds. Like other types of explosions, a blast wave can also cause damage to things and people by the blast wind, debris, and fires. The original explosion will send out fragments that travel very fast. Debris and sometimes even people can get swept up into a blast wave, causing more injuries such as penetrating wounds, impalement and broken bones. The blast wind is the area of low pressure that causes debris and fragments to rush back towards the original explosions. The blast wave can also cause fires or secondary explosions by a combination of the high temperatures that result from detonation and the physical destruction of fuel-containing objects.

== Applications ==
=== Bombs ===
In response to an inquiry from the British MAUD Committee, G. I. Taylor estimated the amount of energy that would be released by the explosion of an atomic bomb in air. He postulated that for an idealized point source of energy, the spatial distributions of the flow variables would have the same form during a given time interval, the variables differing only in scale (thus the name of the "similarity solution.") This hypothesis allows the partial differential equations in terms of r (the radius of the blast wave) and t (time) to be transformed into an ordinary differential equation in terms of the similarity variable:

$$\frac{r^{5}\rho_{o}}{t^{2}E}$$

where $\rho_{o}$ is the density of the air and $E$ is the energy released by the explosion. This result allowed Taylor to estimate the nuclear yield of the Trinity test in New Mexico in 1945 using only photographs of the blast, which had been published in newspapers and magazines. The yield of the explosion was determined by using the equation:

$$E = \frac{\rho_{o}}{t^2} \left(\frac{r}{C}\right)^5$$

where $C$ is a dimensionless constant that is a function of the ratio of the specific heat of air at constant pressure to the specific heat of air at constant volume. The value of C is also affected by radiative losses, but for air, values of C of 1.00-1.10 generally give reasonable results. In 1950, Taylor published two articles in which he revealed the yield E of the first atomic explosion, which had previously been classified and whose publication was therefore a source of controversy.

While nuclear explosions are among the clearest examples of the destructive power of blast waves, blast waves generated by exploding conventional bombs and other weapons made from high explosives have been used as weapons of war because of their effectiveness at creating polytraumatic injury. During World War II and the Vietnam War, blast lung was a common and often deadly injury. Improvements in vehicular and personal protective equipment have helped to reduce the incidence of blast lung. However, as soldiers are better protected from penetrating injury and surviving previously lethal exposures, limb, eye, ear, and brain injuries have become more prevalent.

=== Effects of blast loads on buildings ===
Structural behaviour during an explosion depends on the materials used in the construction of the building. Upon hitting the face of a building, the shock front from an explosion is reflected. This impact with the structure imparts momentum to exterior components of the building. The associated kinetic energy of the moving components must be absorbed or dissipated in order for them to survive. Generally, this is achieved by converting the kinetic energy of the moving component to strain energy in resisting elements. Typically the resisting elements—such as windows, building facades and support columns—fail, causing partial damage through to progressive collapse of the building.

=== Astronomy ===
The so-called Sedov-Taylor solution has become useful in astrophysics. For example, it can be applied to quantify an estimate for the outcome from supernova-explosions. The Sedov-Taylor expansion is also known as the "blast wave" phase, which is an adiabatic expansion phase in the life cycle of supernova. The temperature of the material in a supernova shell decreases with time, but the internal energy of the material is always 72% of E_{0}, the initial energy released. This is helpful for astrophysicists interested in predicting the behavior of supernova remnants.

=== Research ===
Blast waves are generated in research environments using explosive or compressed-gas driven shock tubes in an effort to replicate the environment of a military conflict to better understand the physics of blasts and injuries that may result, and to develop better protection against blast exposure. Blast waves are directed against structures (such as vehicles), materials, and biological specimens or surrogates. High-speed pressure sensors and/or high speed cameras are often used to quantify the response to blast exposure. Anthropomorphic test devices (ATDs or test dummies) initially developed for the automotive industry are being used, sometimes with added instrumentation, to estimate the human response to blast events. For examples, personnel in vehicles and personnel on demining teams have been simulated using these ATDs.

Combined with experiments, complex mathematical models have been made of the interaction of blast waves with inanimate and biological structures. Validated models are useful for "what if" experiments—predictions of outcomes for different scenarios. Depending on the system being modeled, it can be difficult to have accurate input parameters (for example, the material properties of a rate-sensitive material at blast rates of loading). Lack of experimental validation severely limits the usefulness of any numerical model.

== See also ==
- Chapman–Jouguet condition
- Zeldovich–Taylor flow
