= ZND =

ZND may refer to:

- The IATA code for Zinder Airport
- ZND detonation model
- znd, the ISO 639-5 code for Zande languages
