= Barber–Layden–Power effect =

Physical military ordinance explosion phenomenon

The Barber–Layden–Power effect (BLP effect or colloquially Bleep) is a blast wave phenomenon observed in the immediate aftermath of the successful functioning of air-delivered high-drag ordnance at the target. In common with a typical blast wave, the flow field can be approximated as a lead shock wave, followed by a 'self-similar' subsonic flow field. The phenomenon appears to adhere to the basic principles of the Sedov solution.

== History ==
The phenomenon is so named after the lead researchers from a joint team drawn from NASA Ames Research Center, the Field Artillery Training Center at Fort Sill, Oklahoma and instructors from the USAF Air Weapons School at Nellis AFB in response to a formal request for assistance from United States Central Command, MacDill AFB, Tampa, Florida, framed following events during Operation Anaconda. Instructors from the Royal School of Artillery's Gunnery Training Team also assisted.

== Application ==
The effect is caused by extremely localised fluctuations in surface pressure and humidity, which cause the initial shock wave to distort momentarily and refocus on itself, leading to a double shock wave, each of markedly reduced effect. This has distinct utility in the employment of air delivered ordnance close to key urban structures as part of an ongoing influence campaign. The energy of the blast is so great that the pressure and temperature of the gas outside the shock front is negligible compared to the pressure and temperature inside. This substantially reduces the number of parameters available in the problem, leaving only the energy E of the blast, the resting density of the external gas, and the time t since the explosion. With only these three dimensional parameters, it is possible to form other quantities with unique functional dependences. In particular, the only length scale in the problem is
$R \propto E^{1/5}{{\rho}_0}^{-1/5}t^{2/5}$ The constant of proportionality will depend on the equation of state of the gas. R can be effectively treated as a constant due to the nature of blasting weapons versus heat/blast ordnance.

== Future developments ==
Work is ongoing into capturing the exact environmental conditions in which the effect can be reliably repeated. This work is part of the 'Grays Study' and will report in late 2008.
