= Detonator crimping pliers =

Detonator crimping pliers, cap crimping pliers or detonator crimping tool is a common tool when working with explosives. The construction is very similar to the construction of any other multi-tool or pliers. The specific feature is the presence of one groove on each of the opposing jaws. When the jaws are open, the groves will appear as a semi circle with an elliptical extension. When fully closed the two grooves will form a cylindrical shape.

When a detonator is delivered, it is sometimes delivered as a piece of metal with nothing connected to it. To function, the detonator must be mated with the correct initiation source, such as a tar-fuse for time delay, or a shock tube detonator.

The rear part of a detonator is usually made of a rigid but malleable aluminium alloy, sometimes supported by a relatively soft brass or copper structure to aid in reliably giving a strong and watertight seal without damaging the initiation source. A pair of detonator crimping pliers mate the detonator with the initiation source by allowing the detonator's back end to be inserted into the large hole present when the pliers is in the non-compressed position. When force is applied, the jaws will move closer to each other crimping the neck of the detonator. This shows that the function is just a simple crimping tool, adapted for one specific item.

== Risks ==
Each type of detonators have an instruction/information folder written by the manufacturer or the distributor. In it are clear instructions on how to crimp that specific type/model. Most detonators contain relatively sensitive explosive compound meant to initiate the staged detonation train. Crimping a detonator in the wrong place or with improper tools may cause it to detonate.
