= Guderley–Landau–Stanyukovich problem =

Guderley–Landau–Stanyukovich problem describes the time evolution of converging shock waves. The problem was discussed by G. Guderley in 1942 and independently by Lev Landau and K. P. Stanyukovich in 1944, where the later authors' analysis was published in 1955.

== Mathematical description ==
Consider a spherically converging shock wave that was initiated by some means at a radial location $r=R_0$ and directed towards the center. As the shock wave travels towards the origin, its strength increases since the shock wave compresses lesser and lesser amount of mass as it propagates. The shock wave location $r=R(t)$ thus varies with time. The self-similar solution to be described corresponds to the region $r\sim R\ll R_0$, that is to say, the shock wave has travelled enough to forget about the initial condition.

Since the shock wave in the self-similar region is strong, the pressure behind the wave $p_1$ is very large in comparison with the pressure ahead of the wave $p_0$. According to Rankine–Hugoniot conditions, for strong waves, although $p_1\gg p_0$, $\rho_1\sim \rho_0$, where $\rho$ represents gas density; in other words, the density jump across the shock wave is finite. For the analysis, one can thus assume $p_0=0$ and $\rho_0\neq 0$, which in turn removes the velocity scale by setting $c_0=0$ since $c_0^2=\gamma p_0/\rho_0$.

At this point, it is worth noting that the analogous problem in which a strong shock wave propagating outwards is known to be described by the Taylor–von Neumann–Sedov blast wave. The description for Taylor–von Neumann–Sedov blast wave utilizes $\rho_0$ and the total energy content of the flow to develop a self-similar solution. Unlike this problem, the imploding shock wave is not self-similar throughout the entire region (the flow field near $r=R_0$ depends on the manner in which the shock wave is generated) and thus the Guderley–Landau–Stanyukovich problem attempts to describe in a self-similar manner, the flow field only for $r\sim R\ll R_0$; in this self-similar region, energy is not constant and in fact, will be shown to decrease with time (the total energy of the entire region is still constant). Since the self-similar region is small in comparison with the initial size of the shock wave region, only a small fraction of the total energy is accumulated in the self-similar region. The problem thus contains no length scale to use dimensional arguments to find out the self-similar description i.e., the dependence of $R(t)$ on $t$ cannot be determined by dimensional arguments alone. The problems of these kind are described by the self-similar solution of the second kind.

For convenience, measure the time $t$ such that the converging shock wave reaches the origin at time $t=0$. For $t<0$, the converging shock approaches the origin and for $t>0$, the reflected shock wave emerges from the origin. The location of shock wave $r=R(t)$ is assumed to be described by the function

$$R(t) = A (-t)^\alpha$$

where $\alpha$ is the similarity index and $A$ is a constant. The reflected shock emerges with the same similarity index. The value of $\alpha$ is determined from the condition that a self-similar solution exists, whereas the constant $A$ cannot be described from the self-similar analysis; the constant $A$ contains information from the region $r\sim R_0$ and therefore can be determined only when the entire region of the flow is solved. The dimension of $A$ will be found only after solving for $\alpha$. For Taylor–von Neumann–Sedov blast wave, dimensional arguments can be used to obtain $\alpha=2/5.$

The shock-wave velocity is given by

$$D = \frac{dR}{dt} = -\alpha A (-t)^{\alpha-1}= \frac{\alpha R}{t}.$$

According to Rankine–Hugoniot conditions the gas velocity $v_1$, pressure $p_1$ and density $\rho_1$ immediately behind the strong shock front, for an ideal gas are given by

$$\begin{align}
v_1 &= \frac{2}{\gamma+1}D, &
p_1 &= \frac{2}{\gamma+1} \rho_0 D^2, &
\rho_1 &= \rho_0 \frac{\gamma+1}{\gamma-1}.
\end{align}$$

These will serve as the boundary conditions for the flow behind the shock front.

=== Self-similar solution ===
The governing equations are
$$\begin{align}
\frac{\partial \rho}{\partial t} + v \frac{\partial \rho}{\partial r} &= - \rho\left(\frac{\partial v}{\partial r} + \frac{2v}{r}\right),\\
\frac{\partial v}{\partial t} + v \frac{\partial v}{\partial r} &= - \frac{1}{\rho}\frac{\partial p}{\partial r},\\
\frac{\partial s}{\partial t} + v \frac{\partial s}{\partial r} &= 0
\end{align}$$
where $\rho$ is the density, $p$ is the pressure, $s$ is the entropy and $v$ is the radial velocity. In place of the pressure $p(r,t)$, we can use the sound speed $c(r,t)$ using the relation $c^2 = \gamma p/\rho$.

To obtain the self-similar equations, we introduce

$$\begin{align}
\xi &= \frac{r}{R(t)}, &
V(\xi) &= \frac{vt}{\alpha r}, \\
G(\xi) &= \frac{\rho}{\rho_0}, &
Z(\xi) &= \left(\frac{c t}{\alpha r}\right)^2.
\end{align}$$

Note that since both $t$ and $v$ are negative, $V>0$. Formally the solution has to be found for the range $1<\xi<\infty$. The boundary conditions at $\xi=1$ are given by

$$V(1) = \frac{2}{\gamma+1}, \quad G(1)=\frac{\gamma+1}{\gamma-1}, \quad Z(1) = \frac{2\gamma(\gamma-1)}{(\gamma+1)^2}.$$

The boundary conditions at $\xi=\infty$ can be derived from the observation at the time of collapse $t=0$, wherein $\xi$ becomes infinite. At the moment of collapse, the flow variables at any distance from the origin must be finite, that is to say, $v$ and $c^2$ must be finite for $t=0,\,r\neq 0$. This is possible only if

$$V(\infty)=0, \quad Z(\infty) = 0.$$

Substituting the self-similar variables into the governing equations lead to

$$\begin{align}
(1-V) \frac{dV}{d\ln\xi} - \frac{Z}{\gamma}\frac{d\ln G}{d\ln\xi} - \frac{1}{\gamma}\frac{dZ}{d\ln\xi} &= \frac{2}{\gamma}Z- V\left(\frac{1}{\alpha}-V\right),\\
\frac{dV}{d\ln \xi} - (1-V) \frac{d\ln G}{d\ln\xi} & = -3V,\\
(\gamma-1) Z \frac{d\ln G}{d\ln \xi} - \frac{dZ}{d\ln\xi} &= \frac{2Z}{1-V}\left(\frac{1}{\alpha}-V\right).
\end{align}$$

From here, we can easily solve for $d\ln G/d\ln\xi$ and $d\ln V/d\ln\xi$ (or, $d\ln Z/d\ln\xi$) to find two equations. As a third equation, we could two of the equations by eliminating the variable $\xi$. The resultant equations are

$$\begin{align}
\frac{d\ln\xi}{dV} &= - \frac{\Delta}{\Delta_1},\\
(1-V)\frac{d\ln G}{d\ln\xi} &= 3V - \frac{\Delta_1}{\Delta},\\
\frac{dZ}{dV} &= \frac{Z}{1-V} \left\{\frac{\Delta[2/\alpha-(3\gamma-1) V]}{\Delta_1} + \gamma-1\right\}
\end{align}$$

where $\Delta=Z-(1-V)^2$ and $\Delta_1=[3V-2(1-\alpha)/\alpha\gamma]Z - V(1-V)(1/\alpha-V)$. It can be easily seen once the third equation is solved for $Z=Z(V)$, the first two equations can be integrated using simple quadratures.

Guderley-Landau-Stanyukovich integral curve for $\gamma=7/5$

The third equation is first-order differential equation for the function $Z(V)$ with the boundary condition $Z(2/(\gamma+1)) = 2\gamma(\gamma-1)/(\gamma+1)^2$ pertaining to the condition behind the shock front. But there is another boundary condition that needs to be satisfied, i.e., $Z(0)=0$ pertaining to the condition found at $\xi=\infty$. This additional condition can be satisfied not for any arbitrary value of $\alpha$, but there exists only one value of $\alpha$ for which the second condition can be satisfied. Thus $\alpha$ is obtained as an eigenvalue. This eigenvalue can be obtained numerically.

The condition that determines $\alpha$ can be explained by plotting the integral curve $Z=Z(V)$ as shown in the figure as a solid curve. The point $A$ is the initial condition for the differential equation, i.e., $A:(V,Z)=(2/(\gamma+1),2\gamma(\gamma-1)/(\gamma+1)^2)$. The integral curve must end at the point $O:(V,Z)=(0,0)$. In the same figure, the parabola $Z=(1-V)^2$ corresponding to the condition $\Delta=0$ is also plotted as a dotted curve. It can be easily shown than the point $A$ always lies above this parabola. This means that the integral curve $Z=Z(V)$ must intersect the parabola to reach the point $O$. In all the three differential equation, the ratio $\Delta/\Delta_1$ appears implying that this ratio vanishes at point $B$ where the integral curve intersects the parabola. The physical requirement for the functions $V,\,G$ and $Z$ is that they must be single-valued functions of $\xi$ to get a unique solution. This means that the functions $\xi(V),\,\xi(G)$ and $\xi(Z)$ cannot have extrema anywhere inside the domain. But at the point $B$, $\Delta/\Delta_1$ can vanish, indicating that the aforementioned functions have extrema. The only way to avoid this situation is to make the ratio $\Delta/\Delta_1$ at $B$ finite. That is to say, as $\Delta$ becomes zero, we require $\Delta_1$ also to be zero in such a manner to obtain $\Delta/\Delta_1=0/0=\text{finite}$. At $B$,

$$Z=(1-V)^2, \quad (3V-2(1-\alpha)/\alpha\gamma)Z = V(1-V)(1/\alpha-V).$$

Numerical integrations of the third equation provide $\alpha=0.6883740859$ for $\gamma=5/3$ and $\alpha=0.7171745015$ for $\gamma=7/5$. These values for $\alpha$ may be compared with an approximate formula $\alpha = [1+2\gamma/(\sqrt{\gamma}+\sqrt{2})^2]^{-1}$, derived by Landau and Stanyukovich. It can be established that as $\gamma\rightarrow 1$, $\alpha\rightarrow 1$. In general, the similarity index $\alpha$ is an irrational number.

== See also ==
- Taylor–von Neumann–Sedov blast wave
- Zeldovich–Taylor flow
