= Standoff distance =

Standoff distance is a security term that refers to measures to prevent unscreened and potentially threatening people and vehicles from approaching within a certain distance of a building, car, or other shelter, roadblock or other location, or to a person such as a law enforcement officer or VIP, or to a friendly area / location. (Note: T'Jae Gibson, Army Research Laboratory (August 15, 2011) Army seeks safe Soldier solutions through research: See also Gen. David G. Perkins Win in a complex world, and other TRADOC doctrine See Power projection, Identification friend or foe, Display behavior)

Standoff distance is used when a violent criminal is in a fortified position, when hostages are under armed threat from kidnappers, when a bomb is believed to have been placed, or when other unspecified dangers may be lurking. It is a measure of distance used by government, law enforcement, or military operatives handling the situation to protect their own agents and civilians from physical injury or death while the situation is resolved.

Standoff distance may be ensured using fixed physical barriers such as fences or bollards; temporary placement of items to block access (e.g., using law enforcement vehicles or police tape to block a road or bridge); physical features other than barriers (these may appear innocuous, such as the White House lawn or adding an ornamental pond); armed guards or positions (e.g., a police sniper in overwatch); or deploying police officers with carbines such as the M-4, instead of just a service sidearm. When police officers have carbines the standoff distance is increased because an attacker who poses a threat can be fired upon from greater distances.

== Firearms ==
When an armed and violent criminal is sheltered in a location not easily reachable by a tranquilizer round or disabling shot - or lethal ammunition, if authorized by mission leaders - police, military, and counterterrorism officers maintain distance (often out of the direct line of sight and behind cover) while often using a megaphone to call for backup, the arrest of the subject, or to take him/her into custody.

Sniper coverage is used often in these situations, and standard procedure for officers or operatives (or citizens taking part in a citizen's arrest) is to call for heavily armored backup while maintaining cover themselves. In the wake of active shooter scenarios, some law enforcement agencies have switched to moving in on the suspects, to prevent the gunmen from harming civilians. Therapeutic interventions or diplomatic techniques may be used to talk down the suspects or identified threats and assailants.

== Hostage situations ==
In a hostage situation, the primary goal is the safe recovery of the hostages, who are usually held under threat of violence or other prolonged physical harm (starvation, poisoning, bleeding, illness) from kidnappers. Thus the situation is treated similarly to situations with other armed attackers under cover, but with even more caution. Snipers are often employed to attempt to provide leverage against the hostage-takers or to fire at the hostage takers if an imminent risk of harm to the hostages is identified.

Unless all kidnappers can be hit and killed by sniper gunfire almost simultaneously, generally extreme prejudice (e.g., shooting at gunmen) is not used as freely due to the danger of other kidnappers killing the hostages, as in the 1972 Munich example.

This is not true in lone wolf situations, where the hostage taker is often shot by a sniper with armor-piercing or wall-piercing ammunition if talk or negotiation resolution is impossible. In all situations the preferred method is to talk the kidnappers into releasing the hostages for ransom or otherwise talking them down using therapeutic or diplomatic techniques, to protect the safety of the hostages and, ideally, have the suspect surrender peacefully.

== Explosive threats ==
An explosion is an extremely rapid release of energy in the form of light, heat, sound, and a shock wave. A shock wave consists of highly compressed air traveling radially outward from the source at supersonic velocities. As the shock wave expands, pressures decrease rapidly and, when it meets a surface that is in line-of-sight of the explosion, it is reflected and amplified. Pressures also decay rapidly over time and have a very brief span of existence, measured typically in thousandths of a second, or milliseconds. Diffraction effects, caused by corners of a building or structure, may act to confine the air-blast, the airborne shock wave that results from the detonation of the explosives, prolonging its duration. Late in the explosive event, the shock wave becomes negative, creating suction. Behind the shock wave, where a vacuum has been created, air rushes in, creating a powerful wind or drag pressure on all surfaces of the building. This wind picks up and carries flying debris, acting as fragmentation, in the vicinity of the detonation. In an external explosion, a portion of the energy is also imparted to the ground, creating a crater and generating a ground shock wave analogous to a high-intensity, short-duration earthquake.

Note that the severity of an air-blast event is directly dependent on the explosive, distance, and its confinement. The chances of survival dramatically increase as the distance from an explosive threat increases. Note that the majority of the deaths affiliated with explosives are those that are within the immediate vicinity and those that are critically injured by debris generated by material within the vicinity of the explosion.

== Explosives and bombs ==
With explosive threats or bombs, the standoff distance used by law enforcement officers depends on the size and type of the bomb. The smallest standoff distances, about 70 feet (21 m) from the threat, are used for small pipe bombs with about five (5) pounds (2.25 kg) of explosives. A human suicide bomber with about 20 pounds (9 kg) of explosives strapped to his/her body has a standoff distance of 110 feet (33.5 m). A briefcase or suitcase bomb with about 50 pounds (22.67 kg) of explosives has a 150-foot (46 m) standoff distance. Larger car bombs or truck bombs have a much larger standoff distance, as the blast radius is bigger. A car bomb with a 500-pound (226.79 kg) bomb has a 320-foot (97.5 m) standoff distance. A small delivery truck-based truck bomb with a 1,000 pound (453.59 kg) bomb has a 640-foot (195 m) standoff distance. A huge 18-wheeler truck-sized truck bomb with over 60,000 pounds (27215.5 kg) of explosives has a 1,570 foot (478.5 m) standoff distance. This information is included in the following table, note that the distances for mandatory evacuation are for inside and outside of buildings. Also, as a word of caution, note that the mandatory evacuation distance does not necessarily ensure safety, and all should proceed to the preferred evacuation distances indicated below.

Bomb Threat Stand-off Card
Threat Description	Explosive Capacity (lbs)	Mandatory Evacuation Distance (ft)	Min. Preferred Evacuation Distance (ft)
Pipe Bomb	5	70	1,200
Suicide Bomber	20	110	1,700
Briefcase / Suitcase	50	150	1,850
Car	500	320	1,900
SUV / Van	1,000	400	2,400
Small Delivery Truck	4,000	640	3,800
Container / Water Truck	10,000	860	5,100
Semi-Trailer	62,000	1,570	9,300

Standoff distance is also intended to deter terrorists from using car bombs by making it more difficult for them to cause catastrophic damage. In the wake of the Oklahoma City bombing, many high-risk federal buildings began enforcing standoff distances. It is based on the concept that a blast shock load is essentially a high-pressure front that moves out radially and decays very quickly - because blast falloff is thus often more exponential than linear, any standoff distance helps increases survival chances for passersby and minimizes danger, though shrapnel mitigates this effect if present.

Hydraulic roadblocks (sometimes wedge-shaped), or bollards can be raised to block approaching vehicles; these can be designed to prevent even a heavy, fast-moving truck from getting through. Jersey barriers and concrete planters filled with dirt have also been used to maintain separation between screened and unscreened traffic. Certain infrastructure at risk of terrorist attack, such as bridges, may not be well-suited to standoff distances since their purpose is for traffic to travel along them.

The effects of various long duration blast overpressures and the associated effect on structures and the human body are summarized below. Note that this data assumes that the structures and personnel affected by an explosive threat are not protected from debris.

Effect of Long Duration Blast Overpressures
Peak Overpressure (psi)	Effect on Structures	Effect on the Human Body
1	Window glass shatters	Light injuries from fragments occur
2	Moderate damage to houses (windows and doors blown out and severe damage to roofs)	People injured by flying glass and debris
3	Residential structures collapse	Serious injuries are common, fatalities may occur
5	Most buildings collapse	Injuries are universal, fatalities are widespread
10	Reinforced concrete building are severely damaged or demolished	Most people are killed
20	Heavily build concrete building are severely damaged or demolished	Fatalities approach 100%
