= Staged detonation =

Staged detonation is an overall principle used for many explosive devices. A general description of the principle is that one explosive compound with one set of properties is detonated, and the detonation wave from this is transfers into another explosive compound with different set of properties.

The principle is most often used for detonating insensitive explosive compounds by using stages of less and less sensitive explosive compounds. A simple example is the common industrial detonator, where a very small amount of a sensitive explosive detonates, causing the less sensitive main charge of the detonator to detonate. It may involve additional steps where successively less sensitive compounds trigger a detonation wave in each other, with stages including various types of booster charges.

Staged detonation may be used to initiate cheap and insensitive mining explosives, but the principle has other uses. In certain applications there is a need to modify the shape of a detonation wave travelling through an explosive material. One example of this can be found in explosive lenses, in which case the properties of different explosive compounds are used to initiate each stage in the detonation with a specific relative delay, creating a detonation wave with a non conventional shape. That shape can for example be a spherical wave travelling in towards the centre of that sphere, or any other shape required. This principle is used in many areas in high energy research, as well as in nuclear weapons.

The principle does not necessarily involve different explosive compounds. Because the properties of an explosive compound is in some degree related to its density, which is a result of with what pressure it is compressed during manufacture, the stages in a staged detonation may also come from each section having been pressed to a different density, giving it varying properties.

The term "staged detonation" may also refer to a method where several explosive charges are set to detonate in series with a given delay between them. This method called "delayed detonation". This method is commonly used in industrial demolition activities such as mining.

== History and development of the principle ==
The use of a primary and secondary explosive was the first practical use of the staged detonation principle, and was revolutionary to the safety of the mining industry. After this staged detonation is used in everything from explosive lenses in nuclear weapons (where the different properties of each explosive create a perfectly spherical detonation wave moving in towards origo) to mining where each blasting operation requires several stages to detonate each main charge, not only the primary and secondary explosive used in the simplest staged detonation.
