= Self-similar solution =

Concept in partial differential equations

In the study of partial differential equations, particularly in fluid dynamics, a self-similar solution is a form of solution which is similar to itself if the independent and dependent variables are appropriately scaled. Self-similar solutions appear whenever the problem lacks a characteristic length or time scale (for example, the Blasius boundary layer of an infinite plate, but not of a finite-length plate). These include, for example, the Blasius boundary layer or the Sedov–Taylor shell.

== Concept ==
A powerful tool in physics is the concept of dimensional analysis and scaling laws. By examining the physical effects present in a system, we may estimate their size and hence which, for example, might be neglected. In some cases, the system may not have a fixed natural length or time scale, while the solution depends on space or time. It is then necessary to construct a scale using space or time and the other dimensional quantities present—such as the viscosity $\nu$. These constructs are not 'guessed' but are derived immediately from the scaling of the governing equations.

== Classification ==
The normal self-similar solution is also referred to as a self-similar solution of the first kind, since another type of self-similar exists for finite-sized problems, which cannot be derived from dimensional analysis, known as a self-similar solution of the second kind.

=== Self-similar solution of the second kind ===
The early identification of self-similar solutions of the second kind can be found in problems of imploding shock waves (Guderley–Landau–Stanyukovich problem), analyzed by G. Guderley (1942) and Lev Landau and K. P. Stanyukovich (1944), and propagation of shock waves by a short impulse, analysed by Carl Friedrich von Weizsäcker and Yakov Borisovich Zel'dovich (1956), who also classified it as the second kind for the first time. An independent study about the same field was published by Leonid Ivanovich Sedov in 1959. A complete description was made in 1972 by Grigory Barenblatt and Yakov Borisovich Zel'dovich. The self-similar solution of the second kind also appears in different contexts such as in boundary-layer problems subjected to small perturbations, as was identified by Keith Stewartson, Paul A. Libby and Herbert Fox. Moffatt eddies are also a self-similar solution of the second kind.

== Examples ==
=== Rayleigh problem ===
A simple example is a semi-infinite domain bounded by a rigid wall and filled with viscous fluid. At time $t=0$ the wall is made to move with constant speed $U$ in a fixed direction (for definiteness, say the $x$ direction and consider only the $x-y$ plane), one can see that there is no distinguished length scale given in the problem. This is known as the Rayleigh problem. The boundary conditions of no-slip is
$$u{(y\!=\!0)} = U$$

Also, the condition that the plate has no effect on the fluid at infinity is enforced as
$$u{(y\!\to\!\infty)} = 0.$$

Now, from the Navier–Stokes equations
$$\rho \left( \dfrac{\partial \vec{u}}{\partial t} + \vec{u} \cdot \nabla \vec{u} \right) =- \nabla p + \mu \nabla^{2} \vec{u}$$
one can observe that this flow will be rectilinear, with gradients in the $y$ direction and flow in the $x$ direction, and that the pressure term will have no tangential component so that $\dfrac{\partial p}{\partial y} = 0$. The $x$ component of the Navier–Stokes equations then becomes
$$\dfrac{\partial \vec{u}}{\partial t}  = \nu \frac{\partial^2 \vec{u}}{\partial y^2}$$
and the scaling arguments can be applied to show that
$$\frac{U}{t} \sim \nu \frac{U}{y^{2}}$$
which gives the scaling of the $y$ co-ordinate as
$$y  \sim (\nu t)^{1/2}.$$

This allows one to pose a self-similar ansatz such that, with $f$ and $\eta$ dimensionless,
$$u = U f{\left(\eta \equiv \dfrac{y}{(\nu t)^{1/2}}\right)}$$

The above contains all the relevant physics and the next step is to solve the equations, which for many cases will include numerical methods. This equation is
$$- \eta f'/2 = f''$$
with solution satisfying the boundary conditions that
$$f = 1 - \operatorname{erf} (\eta / 2) \quad \text{ or } \quad u = U \left(1 - \operatorname{erf} \left(y / (4 \nu t)^{1/2} \right)\right)$$
which is a self-similar solution of the first kind.

=== Semi-infinite solid approximation ===
In transient heat transfer applications, such as impingement heating on a ship deck during missile launches and the sizing of thermal protection systems, self-similar solutions can be found for semi-infinite solids. The governing equation when heat conduction is the primary heat transfer mechanism is the one-dimensional energy equation:
$$\rho c_{p} \frac{\partial T}{\partial t} = \frac{\partial}{\partial x}\left( k \frac{\partial T}{\partial x}  \right)$$
where $\rho$ is the material's density, $c_{p}$ is the material's specific heat capacity, $k$ is the material's thermal conductivity. In the case when the material is assumed to be homogeneous and its properties constant, the energy equation is reduced to the heat equation:
$$\frac{\partial T}{\partial t} = \alpha \frac{\partial^{2}T}{\partial x^{2}}, \quad \alpha = \frac{k}{\rho c_{p}}$$
with $\alpha$ being the thermal diffusivity. By introducing the similarity variable $\eta = x/\sqrt{t}$ and assuming that $T(t,x) = f(\eta)$, the PDE can be transformed into the ODE:
$$f''(\eta) + \frac{1}{2\alpha}\eta f'(\eta) = 0$$
If a simple model of thermal protection system sizing is assumed, where decomposition, pyrolysis gas flow, and surface recession are ignored, with the initial temperature $T(0,x) = f(\infty) = T_{i}$ and a constant surface temperature $T(t,0) = f(0) = T_{s}$, then the ODE can be solved for the temperature at a depth $x$ and time $t$:
$$T(t,x) = \text{erf}\left( \frac{x}{2\sqrt{\alpha t}} \right) \left( T_{i} - T_{s} \right) + T_{s}$$
where $\text{erf}(\cdot)$ is the error function.
