= Detonation =

Explosion at supersonic velocity

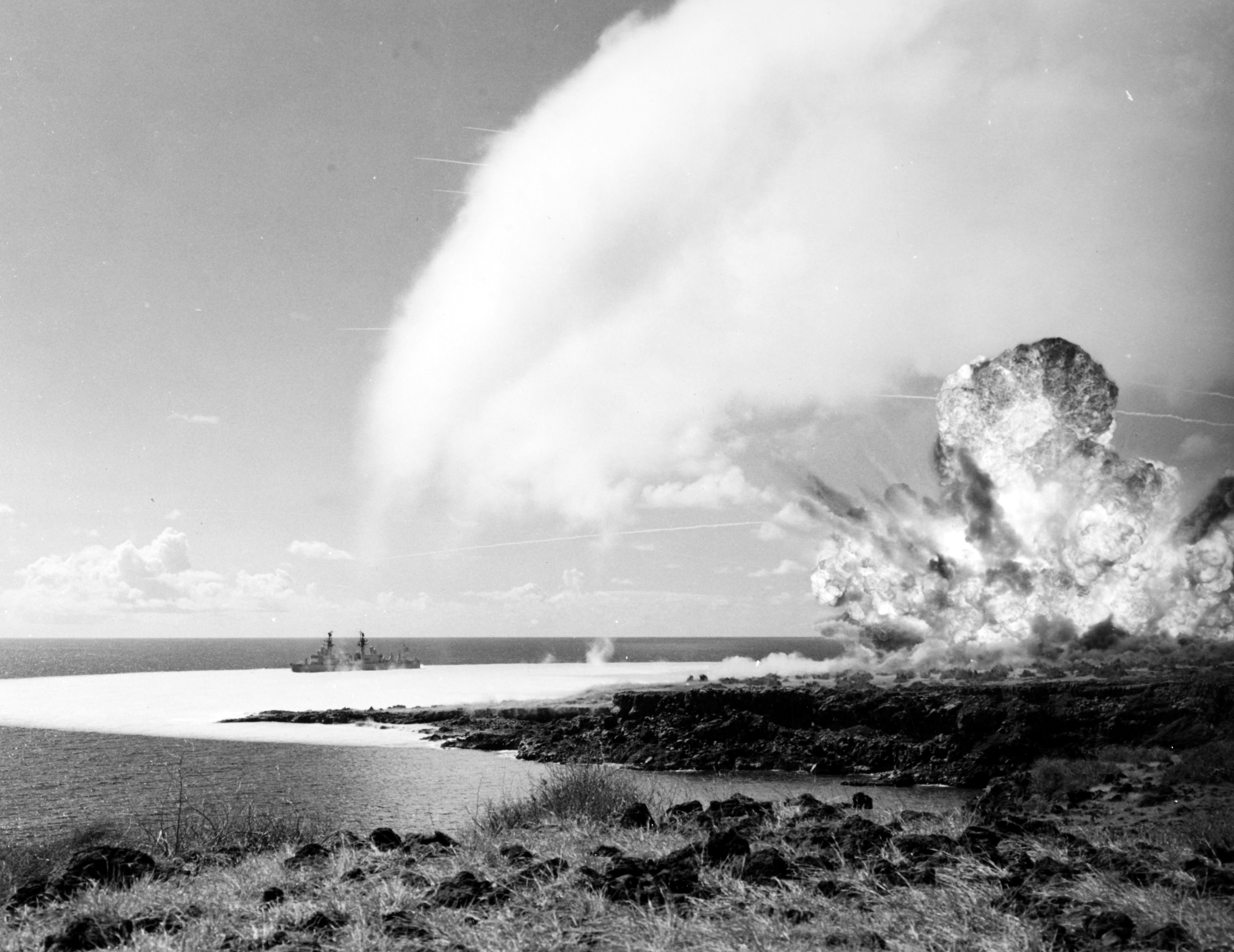
Detonation of TNT, and shock wave

Detonation (from Latin detonare 'to thunder down/forth') is a type of combustion involving a supersonic exothermic front accelerating through a medium that eventually drives a shock front propagating directly in front of it. Detonations propagate supersonically through shock waves with speeds about 1 km/sec and differ from deflagrations which have subsonic flame speeds about 1 m/sec. Detonation may form from an explosion of fuel-oxidizer mixture. Compared with deflagration, detonation doesn't need to have an external oxidizer. Oxidizers and fuel mix when deflagration occurs. Detonation is more destructive than deflagration. In detonation, the flame front travels through the air-fuel faster than sound; while in deflagration, the flame front travels through the air-fuel slower than sound.

Detonations occur in both conventional solid and liquid explosives, as well as in reactive gases. TNT, dynamite, and C4 are examples of high power explosives that detonate. The velocity of detonation in solid and liquid explosives is much higher than that in gaseous ones, which allows the wave system to be observed with greater detail (higher resolution).

A very wide variety of fuels may occur as gases (e.g. hydrogen), droplet fogs, or dust suspensions. In addition to dioxygen, oxidants can include halogen compounds, ozone, hydrogen peroxide, and oxides of nitrogen. Gaseous detonations are often associated with a mixture of fuel and oxidant in a composition somewhat below conventional flammability ratios. They happen most often in confined systems, but they sometimes occur in large vapor clouds. Other materials, such as acetylene, ozone, and hydrogen peroxide, are detonable in the absence of an oxidant (or reductant). In these cases the energy released results from the rearrangement of the molecular constituents of the material.

Detonation was discovered in 1881 by four French scientists Marcellin Berthelot and Paul Marie Eugène Vieille and Ernest-François Mallard and Henry Louis Le Chatelier. The mathematical predictions of propagation were carried out first by David Chapman in 1899 and by Émile Jouguet in 1905, 1906 and 1917. The next advance in understanding detonation was made by John von Neumann and Werner Döring in the early 1940s and Yakov B. Zel'dovich and Aleksandr Solomonovich Kompaneets in the 1960s.

== Theories ==
The simplest theory to predict the behaviour of detonations in gases is known as the Chapman–Jouguet (CJ) condition, developed around the turn of the 20th century. This theory, described by a relatively simple set of algebraic equations, models the detonation as a propagating shock wave accompanied by exothermic heat release. Such a theory describes the chemistry and diffusive transport processes as occurring abruptly as the shock passes.

A more complex theory was advanced during World War II independently by Zel'dovich, von Neumann, and Döring. This theory, now known as ZND theory, admits finite-rate chemical reactions and thus describes a detonation as an infinitesimally thin shock wave, followed by a zone of exothermic chemical reaction. With a reference frame of a stationary shock, the following flow is subsonic, so that an acoustic reaction zone follows immediately behind the lead front, the Chapman–Jouguet condition.

There is also some evidence that the reaction zone is semi-metallic in some explosives.

Both theories describe one-dimensional and steady wavefronts. However, in the 1960s, experiments revealed that gas-phase detonations were most often characterized by unsteady, three-dimensional structures, which can only, in an averaged sense, be predicted by one-dimensional steady theories. Indeed, such waves are quenched as their structure is destroyed. The Wood-Kirkwood detonation theory can correct some of these limitations.

Experimental studies have revealed some of the conditions needed for the propagation of such fronts. In confinement, the range of composition of mixes of fuel and oxidant and self-decomposing substances with inerts are slightly below the flammability limits and, for spherically expanding fronts, well below them. The influence of increasing the concentration of diluent on expanding individual detonation cells has been elegantly demonstrated. Similarly, their size grows as the initial pressure falls. Since cell widths must be matched with minimum dimension of containment, any wave overdriven by the initiator will be quenched.

Mathematical modeling has steadily advanced to predicting the complex flow fields behind shocks inducing reactions. To date, none has adequately described how the structure is formed and sustained behind unconfined waves.

== Applications ==
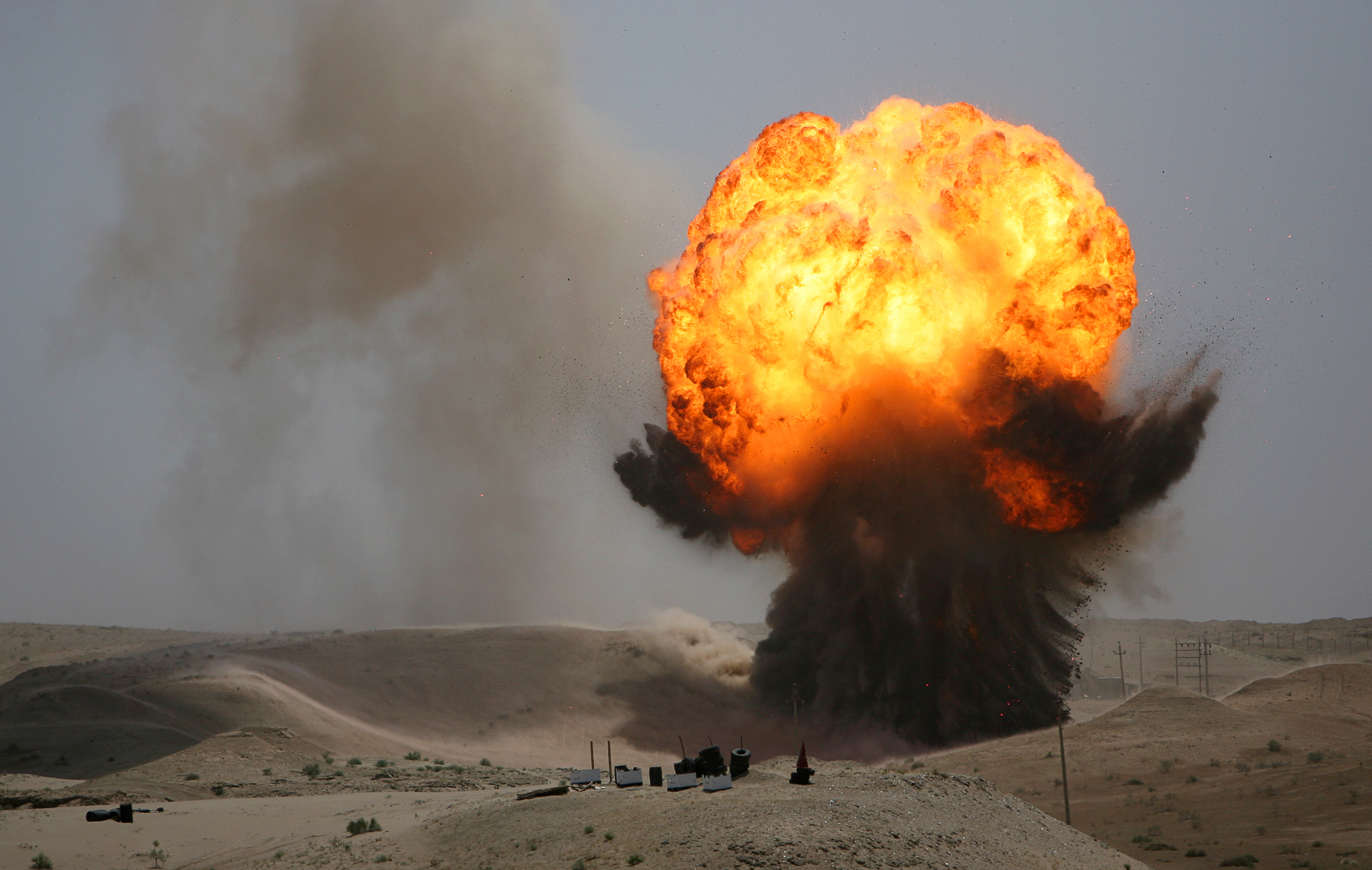
A controlled bomb disposal in Iraq, 2006; detonating the bomb causes fire and smoke to propel upward.

When used in explosive devices, the main cause of damage from a detonation is the supersonic blast front (a powerful shock wave) in the surrounding area. This is a significant distinction from deflagrations where the exothermic wave is subsonic and maximum pressures for non-metal specks of dust are approximately 7–10 times atmospheric pressure. Therefore, detonation is a feature for destructive purposes while deflagration is favored for the acceleration of firearms' projectiles. However, detonation waves may also be used for less destructive purposes, including deposition of coatings to a surface or cleaning of equipment (e.g. slag removal) and even explosively welding together metals that would otherwise fail to fuse. Pulse detonation engines use the detonation wave for aerospace propulsion. The first flight of an aircraft powered by a pulse detonation engine took place at the Mojave Air & Space Port on 31 January 2008.

== In engines and firearms ==
Unintentional detonation when deflagration is desired is a problem in some devices. In Otto cycle, or gasoline engines it is called engine knocking or pinging, and it causes a loss of power. It can also cause excessive heating, and harsh mechanical shock that can result in eventual engine failure. In firearms, it may cause catastrophic and potentially lethal failure.

Pulse detonation engines are a form of pulsed jet engine that has been experimented with on several occasions as this offers the potential for good fuel efficiency.

== See also ==
- Detonator
- Detonation of an explosive charge
- Detonation diamond
- Detonation flame arrester
- Sympathetic detonation
- Nuclear testing
- Predetonation
- Chapman–Jouguet condition
- Engine knocking
- Deflagration
- Relative effectiveness factor
