= Zeldovich–Taylor flow =

Fluid motion of gaseous detonation products

Zeldovich–Taylor flow (also known as Zeldovich–Taylor expansion wave) is the fluid motion of gaseous detonation products behind Chapman–Jouguet detonation wave. The flow was described independently by Yakov Zeldovich in 1942 and G. I. Taylor in 1950, although G. I. Taylor carried out the work in 1941 that being circulated in the British Ministry of Home Security. Since naturally occurring detonation waves are in general a Chapman–Jouguet detonation wave, the solution becomes very useful in describing real-life detonation waves.

== Mathematical description ==
Consider a spherically outgoing Chapman–Jouguet detonation wave propagating with a constant velocity $D$. By definition, immediately behind the detonation wave, the gas velocity is equal to the local sound speed $c$ with respect to the wave. Let $v(r,t)$ be the radial velocity of the gas behind the wave, in a fixed frame. The detonation is ignited at $t=0$ at $r=0$. For $t>0$, the gas velocity must be zero at the center $r=0$ and should take the value $v=D-c$ at the detonation location $r = Dt$. The fluid motion is governed by the inviscid Euler equations

$$\begin{align}
\frac{\partial \rho}{\partial t} + v\frac{\partial \rho}{\partial r} &= - \rho\left(\frac{\partial v}{\partial r} + \frac{2v}{r}\right),\\
\frac{\partial v}{\partial t} + v \frac{\partial v}{\partial r} &= - \frac{1}{\rho}\frac{\partial p}{\partial r},\\
\frac{\partial s}{\partial t} + v \frac{\partial s}{\partial r} &= 0
\end{align}$$
where $\rho$ is the density, $p$ is the pressure and $s$ is the entropy. The last equation implies that the flow is isentropic and hence we can write $c^2 = dp/d\rho$.

Since there are no length or time scales involved in the problem, one may look for a self-similar solution of the form $v(r,t)=v(\xi)$, $p(r,t) = p(\xi)$, $\rho(r,t) = \rho(\xi)$, $c(r,t) = c(\xi)$, where $\xi = r/t$. The first two equations then become

$$\begin{align}
(\xi-v)\rho'/\rho &= v' + 2v/\xi,\\
(\xi-v) v' &= p'/\rho = c^2 \rho'/\rho
\end{align}$$
where prime denotes differentiation with respect to $\xi$. We can eliminate $\rho'/\rho$ between the two equations to obtain an equation that contains only $v$ and $c$. Because of the isentropic condition, we can express $\rho = \rho(c), \, p=p(c)$, that is to say, we can replace $\rho^{-1}d\rho/dx$ with $\rho^{-1}c'd\rho/dc$. This leads to

$$\begin{align}
(\xi-v)\frac{1}{\rho}\frac{d\rho}{dc} c' &= v' + \frac{2v}{\xi},\\
\left[\frac{(\xi-v)^2}{c^2}-1\right]v' &= \frac{2v}{\xi}.
\end{align}$$

For polytropic gases with constant specific heats, we have $\rho^{-1}d\rho/dc = 2/[(\gamma-1)c]$. The above set of equations cannot be solved analytically, but has to be integrated numerically. The solution has to be found for the range $0\leq \xi \leq D$ subjected to the condition $\xi-v=c$ at $\xi=D.$

The function $v(\xi)$ is found to monotonically decrease from its value $v(D) = c(D)-D$ to zero at a finite value of $\xi<D$, where a weak discontinuity (that is a function is continuous, but its derivatives may not) exists. The region between the detonation front and the trailing weak discontinuity is the rarefaction (or expansion) flow. Interior to the weak discontinuity $v=0$ everywhere.

=== Location of the weak discontinuity (Mach wave) ===
From the second equation described above, it follows that when $v=0$, $\xi=c$. More precisely, as $v\rightarrow 0$, that equation can be approximated as

$$(\ln v)' = 2c^2/[\xi(\xi^2-c^2)].$$

As $v \to 0$, $\ln v \to -\infty$ and $(\ln v)' \to \infty$ if $\xi$ decreases as $v \to 0$. The left hand side of the above equation can become positive infinity only if $\xi \to c$. Thus, when $\xi$ decreases to the value $\xi = c_0$, the gas comes to rest (Here $c_0$ is the sound speed corresponding to $v=0$). Thus, the rarefaction motion occurs for $c_0<\xi\leq D$ and there is no fluid motion for $0\leq \xi \leq c_0$.

=== Behavior near the weak discontinuity ===
Rewrite the second equation as

$$v\frac{d\xi}{dv} = \frac{1}{2}\xi\left[\frac{(\xi-v)^2}{c^2}-1\right].$$

In the neighborhood of the weak discontinuity, the quantities to the first order (such as $v,\,\xi-c_0,\,c-c_0$) reduces the above equation to

$$v\frac{d}{dv}(\xi-c_0) = (\xi-c_0) - (v+c-c_0).$$

At this point, it is worth mentioning that in general, disturbances in gases are propagated with respect to the gas at the local sound speed. In other words, in the fixed frame, the disturbances are propagated at the speed $v+c$ (the other possibility is $v-c$ although it is of no interest here). If the gas is at rest $v=0$, then the disturbance speed is $c_0$. This is just a normal sound wave propagation. If however $v$ is non-zero but a small quantity, then one find the correction for the disturbance propagation speed as $v+c=c_0 + \alpha_0 v$ obtained using a Taylor series expansion, where $\alpha_0$ is the Landau derivative (for ideal gas, $\alpha_0 = (\gamma+1)/2$, where $\gamma$ is the specific heat ratio). This means that the above equation can be written as

$$v\frac{d}{dv}(\xi-c_0) - (\xi-c_0) = \alpha_0 v$$

whose solution is

$$\xi-c_0 = \alpha_0 v\ln (A/v)$$

where $A$ is a constant. This determines $v(\xi)$ implicitly in the neighborhood of the week discontinuity where $v$ is small. This equation shows that at $\xi=c_0$, $v=0$, $dv/d\xi=0$, but all higher-order derivatives are discontinuous. In the above equation, subtract $v+c-c_0$ from the left-hand side and $\alpha_0v$ from the right-hand side to obtain

$$\xi-v-c = (\xi-c_0)-(v+c-c_0)=\alpha_0 v[\ln(A/v)-1]$$

which implies that $\xi-v>c$ if $v$ is a small quantity. It can be shown that the relation $\xi-v>c$ not only holds for small $v$, but throughout the rarefaction wave.

=== Behavior near the detonation front ===
First let us show that the relation $\xi-v>c$ is not only valid near the weak discontinuity, but throughout the region. If this inequality is not maintained, then there must be a point where $\xi-v=c,\, v\neq 0$ between the weak discontinuity and the detonation front. The second governing equation implies that at this point $v'$ must be infinite or, $d\xi/dv=0$. Let us obtain $d^2\xi/dv^2$ by taking the second derivative of the governing equation. In the resulting equation, impose the condition $\xi-v=c,\,v\neq 0,\, d\xi/dv=0$ to obtain $d^2\xi/dv^2 = -\alpha_0 \xi/c_0v\neq 0$. This implies that $\xi(v)$ reaches a maximum at this point which in turn implies that $v(\xi)$ cannot exist for $\xi$ greater than the maximum point considered since otherwise $v(\xi)$ would be multi-valued. The maximum point at most can be corresponded to the outer boundary (detonation front). This means that $\xi-v-c$ can vanish only on the boundary and it is already shown that $\xi-v-c$ is positive near the weak discontinuity, $\xi-v-c$ is positive everywhere in the region except the boundaries where it can vanish.

Note that near the detonation front, we must satisfy the condition $\xi-v=c,\, v\neq 0$. The value evaluated at $\xi=D$ for the function $\xi-v$, i.e., $D-v(D)$ is nothing but the velocity of the detonation front with respect to the gas velocity behind it. For a detonation front, the condition $D-v(D)\leq c(D)$ must always be met, with the equality sign representing Chapman–Jouguet detonations and the inequalities representing over-driven detonations. The analysis describing the point $\xi-v=c,\, v\neq 0$ must correspond to the detonation front.

== See also ==
- Taylor–von Neumann–Sedov blast wave
- Guderley–Landau–Stanyukovich problem
