= Gudmund Borelius =

Swedish physicist

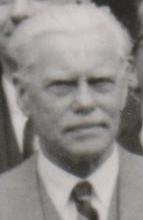
- Born: April 18, 1889; Falu Kristine church parish, Falun Municipality, Sweden
- Died: October 1, 1985 (aged 96); Danderyd, Danderyd Municipality, Sweden
- Known for: Borelius nucleation model
- Spouse: Nils Emmelin
- Children: Anna Borelius-Brodd, Kerstin Emmelin
- Parents: Carl Aron Borelius (1847–1928) (father); Gertrud Frank (1856–1942) (mother)
- Relatives: Fredrik Borelius (brother), Aron Borelius (brother)
- Awards: Swedish Academy of Engineering Sciences's Grand Gold Medal

Carl Olof Gudmund Borelius (18 April 1889 – 1 October 1985) was a Swedish physicist who made contributions in solid-state physics.

== Career ==
Borelius received his licentiate degree in philosophy from Lund University in 1914 and defended his thesis there in 1915. He was a lecturer in physics from 1908 to 1915, associate professor from 1915 to 1922, and professor of physics at the KTH Royal Institute of Technology from 1922 to 1955. His research area was solid-state physics, especially the physics of metals, and he was the initiator of KTH's Master of Science program in engineering physics ("civilingenjör program"), which was started in 1932.

In 1935, Borelius devised a model for homogeneous nucleation in a two-phase system. The model works particularly well near the spinodal decomposition region of the phase diagram.

Borelius was elected a member of the Royal Swedish Academy of Engineering Sciences in 1940 and of the Royal Swedish Academy of Sciences in 1942. In 1960, he was awarded the Swedish Academy of Engineering Sciences's Grand Gold Medal for his research work in the physics of solids and for his contributions to teaching in the field of engineering physics at the technical universities, and in 1974 he was awarded an honorary doctorate from KTH. In memory of Borelius, the Borelius Medal is awarded every year for particularly valuable personal contributions to Engineering Physics at KTH.

== See also ==
- Becker's nucleation model.
