= G. I. Taylor =

British physicist and mathematician (1886–1975)

Sir Geoffrey Ingram Taylor
- Born: 7 March 1886; St. John's Wood, Middlesex, England
- Died: 27 June 1975 (aged 89); Cambridge, Cambridgeshire, England
- Education: Trinity College, Cambridge
- Known for: Taylor–Couette flow Rayleigh–Taylor instability Taylor dispersion Taylor column Saffman–Taylor instability Taylor–von Neumann–Sedov blast wave Taylor microscale Taylor's dislocation Taylor cone Zeldovich–Taylor flow Taylor–Maccoll flow Taylor–Culick flow Taylor–Green vortex Taylor–Proudman theorem Taylor number Taylor scraping flow Taylor's solution Taylor–Walsh eddies Taylor–Culick speed Taylor's potential flow Taylor–Caulfield instability Taylor–Dean flow Taylor–Goldstein equation Taylor impact test Taylor–Melcher leaky dielectric model CQR anchor Eddy diffusion Entrainment; Flow plasticity theory Homogeneous isotropic turbulence
- Awards: FRS (1919)
- Scientific career
- Fields: Physics; Mathematics; Fluid mechanics Fluid dynamics Solid mechanics Wave theory
- Academic advisors: J. J. Thomson
- Doctoral students: George Batchelor; Philip Drazin; Albert E. Green; Francis Bretherton; Rosa M. Morris; Stewart Turner

Sir Geoffrey Ingram Taylor OM FRS FRSE (7 March 1886 – 27 June 1975) was a British physicist, who made major contributions to fluid dynamics and wave theory. Many phenomena of fluid motion are named after him. He is also known for his accurate calculations of the yield of the Trinity nuclear test, based on mathematical modelling and data from photographs.

== Early life and education ==
Taylor was born in St. John's Wood, London. His father, Edward Ingram Taylor, was an artist, and his mother, Margaret Boole, came from a family of mathematicians (his aunt was Alicia Boole Stott and his grandfather was George Boole). As a child he was fascinated by science after attending the Royal Institution Christmas Lectures, and performed experiments using paint rollers and sticky-tape.

Taylor read mathematics and physics at Trinity College, Cambridge from 1905 to 1908. He won several scholarships and prizes at Cambridge, one of which enabled him to study under J. J. Thomson.

== Career and research ==
Taylor published his first paper while he was still an undergraduate. In it, he showed that interference of visible light produced fringes even with extremely weak light sources. The interference effects were produced with light from a gas light, attenuated through a series of dark glass plates, diffracting around a sewing needle. Three months were required to produce a sufficient exposure of the photographic plate. The paper does not mention quanta of light (photons) and does not reference Einstein's 1905 paper on the photoelectric effect, but today the result can be interpreted by saying that less than one photon on average was present at a time.

Once it became widely accepted in around 1927 that the electromagnetic field was quantized, Taylor's experiment began to be presented in pedagogical treatments as evidence that interference effects with light cannot be interpreted in terms of one photon interfering with another photon—that, in fact, a single photon's probability amplitudes do interfere by going through both slits of a double-slit apparatus. Modern understanding of the subject has shown that the conditions in Taylor's experiment were not sufficient to demonstrate this, because the light source was not a single-photon source, but the experiment was reproduced in 1986 using a single-photon source, and the same result was obtained.

He followed this up with work on shock waves, winning a Smith's Prize. In 1910 he was elected to a Fellowship at Trinity College, and the following year he was appointed to a meteorology post, becoming Reader in Dynamical Meteorology. His work on turbulence in the atmosphere led to the publication of "Turbulent motion in fluids", which won him the Adams Prize in 1915. In 1913 Taylor served as a meteorologist aboard the Ice Patrol vessel Scotia, where his observations formed the basis of his later work on a theoretical model of mixing of the air.

At the outbreak of World War I, Taylor was sent to the Royal Aircraft Factory at Farnborough to apply his knowledge to aircraft design, working, amongst other things, on the stress on propeller shafts. He also learned to fly aeroplanes and studied the stability of parachutes.

After the war Taylor returned to Trinity and worked on an application of turbulent flow to oceanography. He also worked on the problem of bodies passing through a rotating fluid. In 1923 he was appointed to a Royal Society research professorship as a Yarrow Research Professor. This enabled him to stop teaching, which he had been doing for the previous four years, and which he both disliked and had no great aptitude for. It was in this period that he did his most wide-ranging work on fluid mechanics and solid mechanics, including research on the deformation of crystalline materials which followed from his war work at Farnborough. He also produced another major contribution to turbulent flow, where he introduced a new approach through a statistical study of velocity fluctuations.

In 1934, Taylor, roughly contemporaneously with Michael Polanyi and Egon Orowan, realised that the plastic deformation of ductile materials could be explained in terms of the theory of dislocations developed by Vito Volterra in 1905. The insight was critical in developing the modern science of solid mechanics.

In 1936 he presented the Royal Institution Christmas Lectures, on "Ships". One of these, on "why ships roll in a rough sea", was the first RI Christmas Lecture to be televised, by the BBC.

=== Manhattan Project ===
During World War II, Taylor again applied his expertise to military problems such as the propagation of blast waves, studying both waves in air and underwater explosions. Independently of two other scientists in the US and the Soviet Union, he devised what is now called Taylor–von Neumann–Sedov blast wave.

Taylor was sent to the United States in 1944–1945 as part of the British delegation to the Manhattan Project. At Los Alamos, Taylor helped solve implosion instability problems in the development of atomic weapons, particularly the plutonium bomb used at Nagasaki on 9 August 1945.

In 1944 he also received his knighthood and the Copley Medal from the Royal Society. He was elected to the United States National Academy of Sciences the following year.

Taylor was present at the Trinity nuclear test, July 16, 1945, as part of General Leslie Groves' "VIP List" of 10 people who observed the test from Compania Hill, about 20 miles (32 km) northwest of the shot tower. By coincidence, Joan Hinton, another direct descendant of the mathematician George Boole, had been working on the same project and witnessed the event in an unofficial capacity. The cousins met at the time but later followed different paths. Joan, strongly opposed to nuclear weapons, defected to Mao's China, while Taylor maintained that political policy was not within the remit of the scientist.

In 1950, he published two related papers in the Proceedings of the Royal Society. The first, originally written in 1941 but classified at that time, described how the size of the bomb blast increased with time. Taylor showed that the radius of the blast was proportional to the time since detonation to the power of 2/5. In the second paper he estimated the yield of the explosion using high speed photography stills from the Trinity test, bearing timestamps and physical scale of the blast radius. The 2/5 power law matched the observational data remarkably well. He gave two estimates of 16.8 and 23.7 kt, close to the accepted value of 20 kt, which was still highly classified at that time.

=== Later life ===
Taylor continued his research after the war, serving on the Aeronautical Research Committee and working on the development of supersonic aircraft. Though he officially retired in 1952, he continued research for the next twenty years, concentrating on problems that could be attacked using simple equipment. This led to such advances as a method for measuring the second coefficient of viscosity. Taylor devised an incompressible liquid with separated gas bubbles suspended in it. The dissipation of the gas in the liquid during expansion was a consequence of the shear viscosity of the liquid. Thus the bulk viscosity could easily be calculated. His other late work included the longitudinal dispersion in flow in tubes, movement through porous surfaces, and the dynamics of thin sheets of liquids.

Between the ages of 78 and 83, Taylor wrote six papers on electrohydrodynamics. In this work he returned to his interest in electrical activity in thunderstorms, as jets of conducting liquid motivated by electrical fields. The cone from which such jets are observed is called the Taylor cone, after him. He went on to publish two more papers, on additional topics, in 1971 and 1973. In 1972 D. H. MIchael read Taylor's paper, on making holes in a thin sheet of liquid, at the 13th International Conferences for Theoretical and Applied Mechanics in Moscow. Taylor had suffered a stroke and could not attend. He had presented at every one of the previous conferences.

Aspects of Taylor's life often found expression in his work. His over-riding interest in the movement of air and water, and by extension his studies of the movement of unicellular marine creatures and of weather, were related to his lifelong love of sailing. In the 1930s he invented the 'CQR' anchor, which was both stronger and more manageable than any in use, and which was used for all sorts of small craft including seaplanes.

== Personal life ==
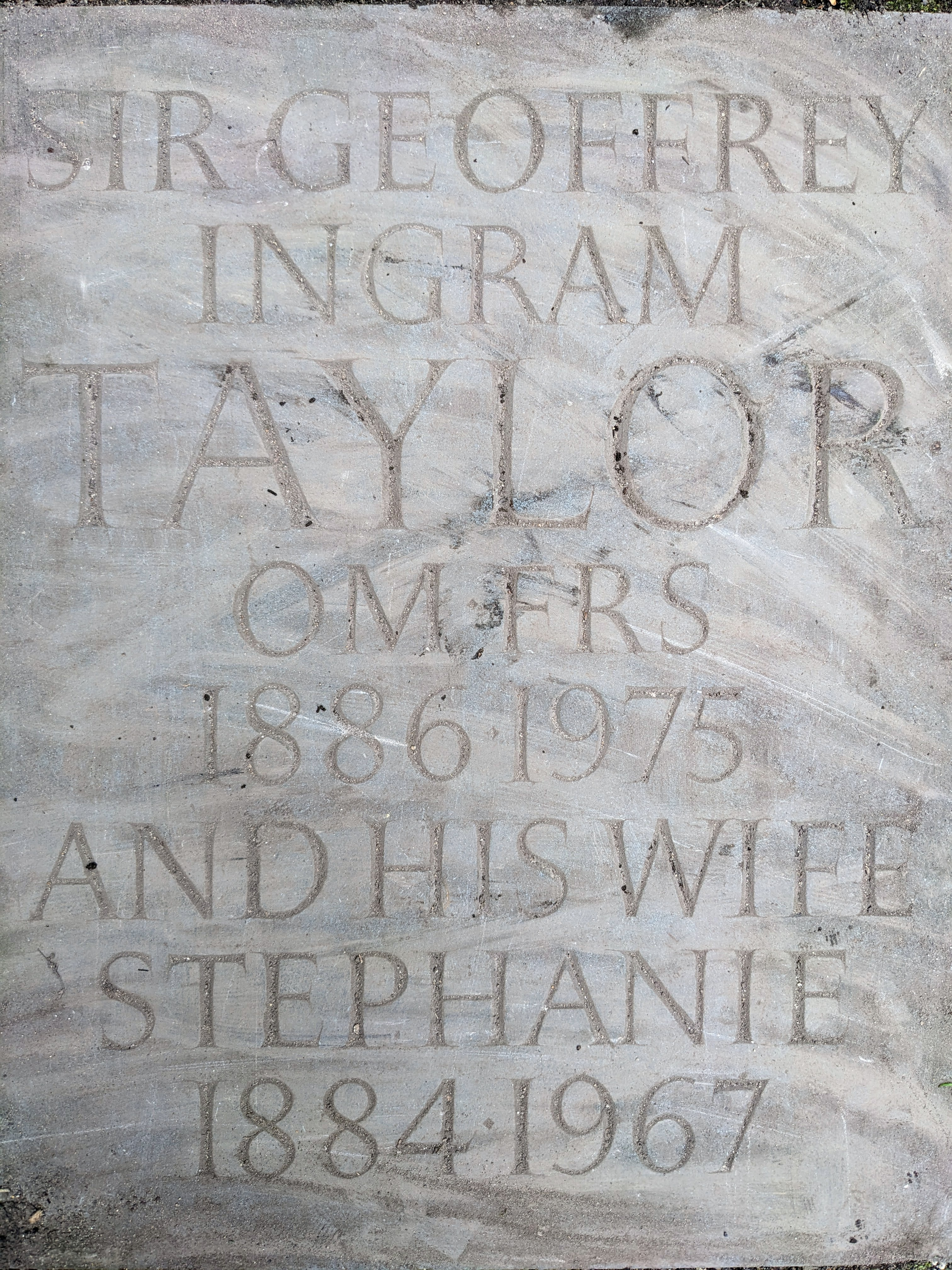
Grave of Sir Geoffrey Ingram Taylor in Cambridge

Taylor married Grace Stephanie Frances Ravenhill, a school teacher in 1925. They stayed together until Stephanie's death in 1967. Taylor suffered a severe stroke in 1972 which effectively put an end to his work. He died in Cambridge in 1975. He is buried in the churchyard of St Edward King and Martyr, Cambridge.

== Awards ==
Taylor received many awards and honours.

- Theodore von Kármán Prize in applied mathematics (1972), Society for Industrial and Applied Mathematics (SIAM)
- Theodore von Karman Medal in engineering mechanics (1969), American Society of Civil Engineers (ASCE)
- A. A. Griffith Medal and Prize (1969), Institute of Materials, Minerals and Mining
- Order of Merit (14 July 1969), Monarch of the United Kingdom
- Honorary member (1966), American Society of Mechanical Engineers
- Franklin Medal (1962), Franklin Institute
- Kelvin Gold Medal (1959), Institution of Electrical Engineers
- Timoshenko Medal (1958), American Society of Mechanical Engineers
- De Morgan Medal (1956), London Mathematical Society
- Member, American Academy of Arts and Sciences (1956)
- International Member of the American Philosophical Society (1955)
- Wilhelm Exner Medal (1954), Austrian Trade Association (Österreichischer Gewerbeverein)
- Symons Gold Medal (1951), Royal Meteorological Society
- Knight Bachelor (1944), Monarch of the United Kingdom
- Copley Medal (1944), Royal Society
- Royal Medal (1933), Royal Society
- Bakerian Medal (1923), Royal Society
- FRS (1919)
- Adams Prize (1915), University of Cambridge
- Smith's Prize (1910), University of Cambridge
