= Taylor–Culick speed =

In fluid dynamics, Taylor–Culick speed ( or Taylor–Culick formula) refers to the speed at which a liquid sheet or soap film retracts upon rupture. The formula was derived in 1960 independently by Geoffrey Ingram Taylor and F. E. C. Culick. The formula for the retraction speed is given by

$$V = \sqrt{\frac{2\gamma}{\rho h}}$$

where $\gamma$ is the surface tension, $\rho$ is the fluid density and $h$ is the initial thickness of the sheet. Prior to Taylor and Culick's work, A. Dupre (1867) and Lord Rayleigh studied this problem.
