= Émile Jouguet =

French engineer and scientist

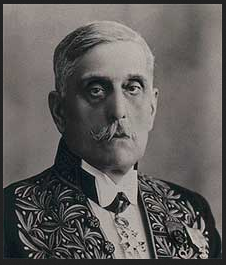
Image of Émile Jouguet

Jacques Charles Émile Jouguet (5 January 1871, in Bessèges (Gard) – 2 April 1943, in Montpellier) was a French engineer and scientist, whose name is attached to the Chapman–Jouguet condition.

He was the son of Félix Jouguet (1831–1887), mining engineer and mayor of Bessèges.

A graduate of l'École polytechnique (ranked third in the class of 1889) and of the l'École des mines de Paris (ranked first in the class of 1895), he worked as an engineer in the Corps des mines from 1895 to 1898. He was a professor at l'École des mines de Saint-Étienne from 1898 to 1907. Émile Jouguet is known primarily for his work in thermodynamics and hydrodynamics, particularly in relation to heat engines and explosives and also for his work on shock waves.

In 1910, he was appointed Chief Engineer of the control of railroads in Paris. He was responsible for developing a comprehensive system of operations and signalling used throughout the rail network in France. He served as a professor at the I'École des Mines de Paris from 1910 to 1914 and again from 1920 to 1939. During World War I, he was a lieutenant-colonel of artillery.

In 1921, Jouguet won the Poncelet Prize. In 1930, he was elected as a member of l'Académie des sciences, and in 1936, he was honored with the rank of commandeur de la légion d'honneur.

== Books by Jouguet ==
- Mécanique des fluides. Sainte-Étienne: Sociéte de l'imprimerie Théolier—J. Thomas & Cie. 1904.
- Lectures de mécanique. La mécanique enseignée par les auteurs originaux. Vol. Première - deuxième partie. Paris: Gauthier-Villars. 1906–1909. (1924, new edition with notes and additions)
- Théories des moteurs thermiques. Paris: Octave Doin et fils. 1909.
- Mécanique des explosifs: étude de dynamique chimique. Paris: Octave Doin et fils. 1917.
- Notes sur la théorie de l'élasticité. Toulouse: E. Privat. 1921.
- Cours de mécanique. Paris: École Polytechnique. 1928–1929.
