= Atmospheric focusing =

Type of wave interaction causing shock waves

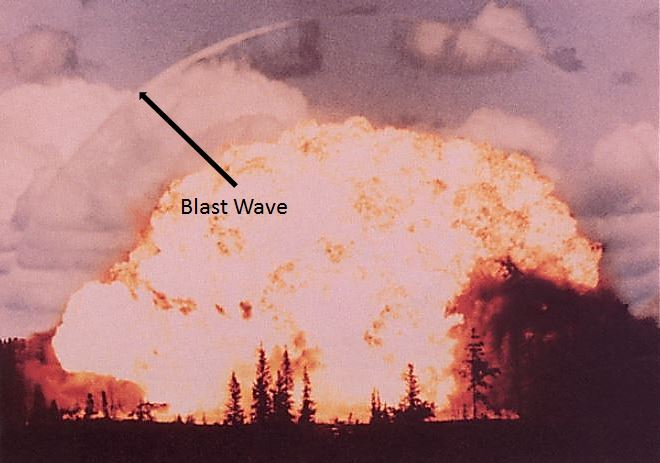
image of an explosion with a labeled shock wave

Atmospheric focusing is a type of wave interaction causing shock waves to affect areas at a greater distance than otherwise expected. Variations in the atmosphere create distortions in the wavefront by refracting a segment, allowing it to converge at certain points and constructively interfere. In the case of destructive shock waves, this may result in areas of damage far beyond the theoretical extent of its blast effect. Examples of this are seen during supersonic booms, large extraterrestrial impacts from objects like meteors, and nuclear explosions.

Density variations in the atmosphere (e.g. due to temperature variations), or airspeed variations cause refraction along the shock wave, allowing the uniform wavefront to separate and eventually interfere, dispersing the wave at some points and focusing it at others. A similar effect occurs in water when a wave travels through a patch of different density fluid, causing it to diverge over a large distance. For powerful shock waves this can cause damage further than expected; the shock wave energy density will decrease beyond expected values based on uniform geometry ($1/r^2$ falloff for weak shock or acoustic waves, as expected at large distances).

== Types of atmospheric focusing ==
=== Supersonic booms ===
Atmospheric focusing from supersonic booms is a modern occurrence and a result of the actions of air forces across the world. When objects like planes travel faster than the speed of sound, they create sonic booms and pressure waves that can be focused. Atmospheric factors present when these waves are created can focus the waves and cause damage.

Planes can also create boom waves and explosion waves that can be focused. Consideration for atmospheric focusing in flight plans is critical. The wind and altitude during a flight can create environments for atmospheric focusing, which can be determined through reference to a focusing curve. When this is the case, supersonic flight may cause damage on the ground.

=== Meteor impacts ===
Meteors can also cause shock waves that can be focused. As the meteor enters Earth’s atmosphere and reaches lower altitudes, it can create a shock wave. The shock wave is impacted by what the meteor is made of, temperature, and pressure. Since the meteors need to have a large size and mass, there is only a small percentage of meteors that can create these shock waves. Radar and Infrasonic methodologies are able to detect meteor shock waves. These tools are used to study these shock waves and can help create new methods of learning about meteor shock waves.

=== Nuclear explosions and bombs ===
Nuclear explosions and bombs can also lead to atmospheric focusing. The effects of focusing may be found hundreds of kilometers from the blast site. An example of this is the case of the Tsar Bomba test, where damage was caused up to approximately 1,000 km away. Atmospheric focusing can increase the damage caused by these explosions.

== See also ==
- Knudsen number
- Nuclear weapons testing
- Rankine–Hugoniot conditions
