= Werner Döring =

German physicist

Werner Döring (2 September 1911, Berlin – 6 June 2006, Malente) was a German theoretical physicist. From 1963 until his retirement in 1977, he was a full professor (Ordinarius) at the Universität Hamburg. His main interest was the theory of magnetism. His textbooks on theoretical physics have influenced several generations of students.

He is remembered today for the Becker–Döring theory of nucleation of liquid droplets in solids (in condensed matter physics), and for the Zel'dovich–von Neumann–Döring detonation model (in explosives engineering).

== Selected publications ==
- R. Becker, W. Döring, Kínetische Behandlung der Keimbildung in übersättigten Dämpfen, Annalen der Physik 416, 719-752 (1935); https://doi.org/10.1002/andp.19354160806
- R. Becker, W. Döring, Ferromagnetismus, Berlin, Springer 1939
- W. Döring, Einführung in die Theoretische Physik (Sammlung Göschen; fünf Bände: Mechanik, Elektrodynamik, Optik, Thermodynamik, Statistische Mechanik), Berlin, 1957
- W. Döring, Einführung in die Quantenmechanik, Vandenhoeck & Ruprecht, Göttingen 1962
- W. Döring, Mikromagnetismus, in: Handbuch der Physik, S. Flügge Ed., Bd. XVIII/2, 1966
- W. Döring, Point Singularities in Micromagnetism, Journal of Applied Physics 39, 1006-1007 (1968); https://doi.org/10.1063/1.1656144
- W. Döring, Atomphysik und Quantenmechanik (Band 1: Grundlagen - Berlin: De Gruyter, 2. verbesserte Auflage 1981, ISBN 3-11-008199-7; Band 2: Die allgemeinen Gesetze, ditto, 1976, ISBN 3-11-004590-7; Band 3: Anwendungen, ditto, 1979, ISBN 3-11-007090-1)
