= Richard Becker (physicist) =

German physicist (1887–1955)

- Born: 3 December 1887; Hamburg, Germany
- Died: 16 March 1955 (aged 67); Bad Schwalbach, Hesse, Germany
- Known for: Becker nucleation model
- Title: President of the German Physical Society

Richard Becker (German pronunciation: [ˈʁɪçaʁt ˈbɛkɐ]; 3 December 1887 – 16 March 1955) was a German theoretical physicist who made contributions in thermodynamics, statistical mechanics, superconductivity, and quantum electrodynamics.

== Early life ==
Becker was born in Hamburg. His studies in zoology started in 1906 at the Albert Ludwig University of Freiburg, where he earned his doctorate in 1909 under August Weismann. After hearing lectures by Arnold Sommerfeld at the Ludwig-Maximilians-Universität München, Becker turned his professional interest to physics. He also studied physics under Max Born at the Georg August University of Göttingen, and Max Planck and Albert Einstein at the Friedrich Wilhelm University of Berlin. Becker completed his Habilitation in 1922 under Planck.

During World War I, Becker worked in German industrial organizations, including the Kaiser-Wilhelm Institut für physikalische Chemie und Elektrochemie and the lighting manufacturer Osram.

In 1919, Sommerfeld recommended three of his students as qualified to become physics assistant to the mathematician David Hilbert at the University of Göttingen. The list included Adolf Kratzer, Becker, and Franz Pauer. Kratzer, first on the list, went to the University of Göttingen.

== Career ==
Upon Habilitation, Becker became a Privatdozent at the University of Berlin. In 1926, he became ordinarius professor at the Technische Hochschule Berlin (Today: Technische Universität Berlin) and head of the new physics department there.

In 1935, Sommerfeld, the theoretician who helped to usher in quantum mechanics and educated a new generation of physicists to carry on with the revolution, reached the age for which he could achieve emeritus status. The Munich Faculty drew up a candidate list to replace him as ordinarius professor of theoretical physics and head of the Institute for Theoretical Physics. There were three names on the list: Werner Heisenberg, who received the Nobel Prize in Physics in 1932, Peter Debye, who would receive the Nobel Prize in Chemistry in 1936, and Becker - all former students of Sommerfeld. The Munich Faculty was firmly behind these candidates. However, academic supporters of Deutsche Physik and elements in the Reichserziehungsministerium (Acronym: REM, and translation: Reich Education Ministry) had their own list of candidates and the battle commenced.

In 1936, Becker and Döring devised a model for homogeneous nucleation in a two-phase system. The model works particularly well near the equilibrium region of the phase diagram.

Adolf Hitler had come to power in Germany on 30 January 1933 and Max Born had taken leave as director of the Institute of Theoretical Physics at the Georg-August University of Göttingen on 1 July of that year and immigrated to England. In 1934, Fritz Sauter, while only a Privatdozent, was brought to the University of Göttingen as acting director of the Institute of Theoretical Physics (ITP) and lecturer on theoretical physics; Born was officially retired under the Nuremberg laws on 31 December 1935. Sauter, who had been an assistant to Becker at the Technische Hochschule Berlin, continued as the acting director of the ITP until 1936, when Becker was appointed director of the ITP and ordinarius professor of theoretical physics, after the REM eliminated Becker's position at Berlin and reassigned him to the University of Göttingen. Becker remained there as director until his death in Bad Schwalbach in 1955.

In 1954, Becker became president of the Deutsche Physikalische Gesellschaft.

Becker's students included Eugene Wigner, who received the Nobel Prize in Physics in 1963, Rolf Hagedorn, Wolfgang Paul and Hans Georg Dehmelt, who shared the Nobel Prize in Physics in 1989, and Herbert Kroemer, who received the Nobel Prize in Physics in 2000.

== Books ==
- Richard Becker Theorie der Elektrizität. neubearbeitung des Werkes von M. Abraham (Teubner, 1933)
- Richard Becker Theorie der Wärme (Springer, 1950, 1966, and 1985)
- Richard Becker Vorstufe zur Theoretischen Physik (Springer, 1950)
- Richard Becker, author and Fritz Sauter, editor Theorie der Elektrizität. Bd. 1. Einführung in die Maxwellsche Theorie (Teubner, 1957, 1962, 1964, and 1969)
  - Richard Becker, author, Fritz Sauter, editor, and Ivor De Teissier, translator Electromagnetic Fields and Interactions, Volume I: Electromagnetic Theory and Relativity (Blaisdell, 1964)
- Richard Becker, author and Fritz Sauter, editor Theorie der Elektrizität. Bd. 2. Einführung in die Quantentheorie der Atome und der Strahlung (Teubner, 1959, 1963, 1970, and 1997)
  - Richard Becker, author, Fritz Sauter, editor, and Ivor De Teissier, translator Electromagnetic Fields and Interactions, Volume II: Quantum Theory of Atoms and Radiation (Blaisdell, 1964)
- Richard Becker, author and Fritz Sauter, editor Electromagnetic Fields and Interactions Revised in 1964, and in a single volume. (Dover) ISBN 0-486-64290-9
- Richard Becker, author and Fritz Sauter, editor Theorie der Elektrizität. Bd. 3. Elektrodynamik der Materie (Teubner, 1969)

== See also ==
- Borelius' nucleation model.
- Becker–Morduchow–Libby solution
