= Leonid Sedov =

Russian physicist (1907–1999)

Leonid Ivanovich Sedov (Russian: Леонид Иванович Седов; 14 November 1907, Rostov-on-Don – 5 September 1999, Moscow) was a Russian physicist who worked as an engineer in the former Soviet space program.

In 1930 Sedov graduated from the Moscow State University, where he had been a student of Sergey Chaplygin, with the degree of Doctor of Physics and Mathematical Sciences. He later became a professor at the university.

During World War II, he devised the so-called Sedov Similarity Solution for a blast wave, now called Taylor–von Neumann–Sedov blast wave after three scientists who did that independently. In 1947 he was awarded the Chaplygin Prize.

He was the first chairman of the USSR Space Exploration program and broke first news of its existence in 1955. He was president of the International Astronautical Federation (IAF) from 1959 to 1961. Until recently, it had been thought that Sedov was the principal engineer behind the Soviet Sputnik project.

== Awards and honors ==
- Order of the Badge of Honour (1943)
- Two Orders of the Red Banner of Labour (1945, 1961)
- Stalin Prize, 2nd class (1952)
- Six Orders of Lenin (1954, 1963, 1967, 1975, 1980, 1987)
- Hero of Socialist Labour (1967)
- Allan D. Emil Memorial Award (1981)
- Order "For Merit to the Fatherland", 4th class (1998)

== See also ==
- Taylor–Von-Neumann–Sedov-blast wave

== Bibliography ==
- Reference to 1955 announcement
- Obituary notice in Minutes of General Assembly Meetings, 2000 section
- Sedov, L. I., 1959, Similarity and Dimensional Methods in Mechanics, 4th edn. Academic.
- L.I. Sedov, A course in continuum mechanics. Volumes. I-IV. Wolters-Noordhoff Publishing, Netherlands, 1971.
- Sedov, L. I., "Propagation of strong shock waves," Journal of Applied Mathematics and Mechanics, Vol. 10, pages 241–250 (1946). (See also: Barber–Layden–Power effect)
- Reference to confusion with Ukrainian physicist Sergei Korolyov .
