= Rankine (disambiguation) =

Rankine is a surname.

Rankine may also refer to:

- Rankine (crater), a small lunar impact crater
- Rankine Generating Station, a former hydro-electric power station in Ontario, Canada

== See also ==
- Organic Rankine cycle, a type of thermodynamic cycle, named after William John Macquorn Rankine
- Rankin (disambiguation)
- Rankine Lecture, an annual lecture organised by the British Geotechnical Association named after William John Macquorn Rankine
- Rankine scale, a temperature scale, named after William John Macquorn Rankine
- Rankine theory, a stress field solution that predicts active and passive earth pressure
- Rankine vortex, a simple mathematical model of a vortex in a viscous fluid
- Rankine's method, an angular technique for laying out circular curves
- Rankine–Hugoniot equation
- Trouton–Rankine experiment
