= Rankin =

Rankin may refer to:

== Places ==
=== Australia ===
- Division of Rankin, Queensland, an electoral district of the Australian Federal House of Representatives
- Rankin County, New South Wales

=== Canada ===
- Rankin Inlet, Nunavut
  - Rankin Inlet Airport, Nunavut
- Rankin River, Ontario
- Rankin Location 15D, a reserve of the Batchawana First Nation in Ontario
- Rankin Lake, Nova Scotia

=== United States ===
- Rankin, Illinois, a village
- Rankin, Missouri, an unincorporated community
- Rankin, Oklahoma, an unincorporated community
- Rankin, Pennsylvania, a borough
  - Rankin Bridge
- Rankin, Texas, a city in Upton County
- Rankin, Ellis County, Texas, an unincorporated community
- Rankin, Wisconsin, an unincorporated community
- Rankin County, Mississippi
- Rankin Independent School District, Texas

== People ==
- Rankin (surname), including a list of people with the surname
- Rankin Gibson (1916-2001), American lawyer and associate justice of the Ohio Supreme Court
- Rankin (photographer), British portrait and fashion photographer John Rankin Waddell (born 1966)

== Other uses ==
- The Rankin Family, a Canadian folk music group
- HMAS Rankin (SSG 78)
- USS Rankin (AKA-103)
- Modified Rankin scale, a measure of disability

== See also ==
- Rankin v. McPherson
- On the United States National Register of Historic Places:
  - Rankin Building (disambiguation)
  - Rankin House (disambiguation)
  - Rebecca Rankin Round Barn, Poling, Indiana
  - Rankin Octagonal Barn, Silverton, West Virginia
- Rankine
