= W. J. M. Rankine =

Scottish mechanical engineer (1820–1872)

William Rankine FRSE FRS
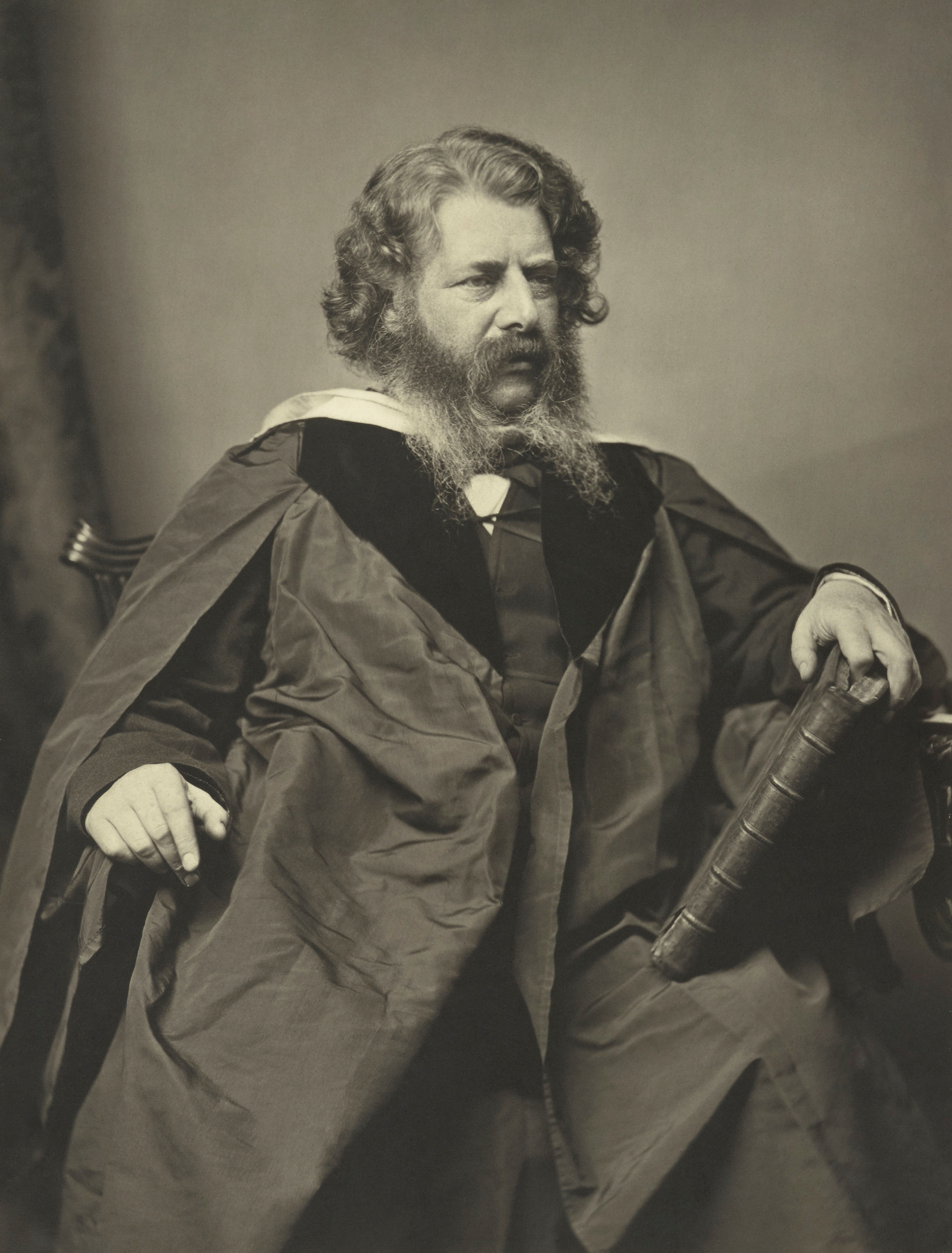
- William John Macquorn Rankine
- Born: 5 July 1820; Edinburgh, Scotland
- Died: 24 December 1872 (aged 52); Glasgow, Scotland
- Education: University of Edinburgh
- Known for: Rankine body; Rankine half body; Rankine cycle; Rankine's method; Rankine scale; Rankine theory; Rankine vortex; Rankine–Hugoniot relation; Laws of thermodynamics; Second law of thermodynamics; Entropy; Heat death of the universe; Kelvin's heat death paradox; Coining the term potential energy
- Awards: Keith Medal (1854)
- Scientific career
- Fields: Physics, engineering, civil engineering
- Workplaces: University of Glasgow

Signature
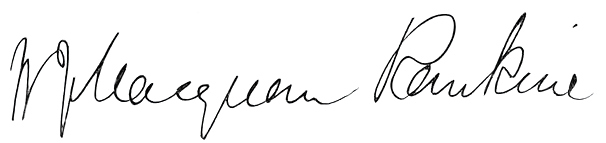

William John Macquorn Rankine FRSE FRS (/ˈræŋkɪn/; 5 July 1820 – 24 December 1872) was a Scottish mathematician and physicist. He was a founding contributor, with Rudolf Clausius and William Thomson (Lord Kelvin), to the science of thermodynamics, particularly focusing on its First Law. He developed the Rankine scale, a Fahrenheit-based equivalent to the Celsius-based Kelvin scale of temperature.

Rankine developed a complete theory of the steam engine and indeed of all heat engines. His manuals of engineering science and practice were used for many decades after their publication in the 1850s and 1860s. He published several hundred papers and notes on science and engineering topics, from 1840 onwards, and his interests were extremely varied, including, in his youth, botany, music theory and number theory, and, in his mature years, most major branches of science, mathematics and engineering.

He was also a singer, pianist and cellist as well as a rifleman.

== Life ==
Rankine was born in Edinburgh to David Rankine, a civil engineer from a military background, who later worked on the Edinburgh and Dalkeith Railway (locally known as the Innocent Railway). His mother was Barbara Grahame, of a prominent legal and banking family.

His father moved around Scotland on various projects and the family moved with him. William was initially educated at home, due to his poor health, but he later attended Ayr Academy (1828–29) and then the High School of Glasgow (1830). Around 1830 the family moved to Edinburgh when the father got a post as Manager of the Edinburgh to Dalkeith Railway. The family then lived at 2 Arniston Place.

In 1834, he was sent to the Scottish Naval and Military Academy on Lothian Road in Edinburgh with the mathematician George Lee. By that year William was already highly proficient in mathematics and received, as a gift from his uncle, Isaac Newton's Principia (1687) in the original Latin.

In 1836, Rankine began to study a spectrum of scientific topics at the University of Edinburgh, including natural history under Robert Jameson and natural philosophy under James David Forbes. Under Forbes he was awarded prizes for essays on methods of physical inquiry and on the undulatory (or wave) theory of light. During vacations, he assisted his father who, from 1830, was manager and, later, effective treasurer and engineer of the Edinburgh and Dalkeith Railway which brought coal into the growing city. He left the University of Edinburgh in 1838 without a degree (which was not then unusual) and, perhaps because of straitened family finances, became an apprentice to Sir John Benjamin Macneill, who was at the time surveyor to the Irish Railway Commission. During his pupilage he developed a technique, later known as Rankine's method, for laying out railway curves, fully exploiting the theodolite and making a substantial improvement in accuracy and productivity over existing methods. In fact, the technique was simultaneously in use by other engineers – and in the 1860s there was a minor dispute about Rankine's priority.

The year 1842 also marked Rankine's first attempt to reduce the phenomena of heat to a mathematical form but he was frustrated by his lack of experimental data. At the time of Queen Victoria's visit to Scotland, later that year, he organised a large bonfire situated on Arthur's Seat, constructed with radiating air passages under the fuel. The bonfire served as a beacon to initiate a chain of other bonfires across Scotland.

In 1850, he was elected a Fellow of the Royal Society of Edinburgh his proposer being Prof James David Forbes. He won the Society's Keith Prize for the period 1851–53. He served as the Society's Vice President from 1871 to 1872.

From 1855, he was Professor of Civil Engineering and Mechanics at Glasgow University.

He died at 8 Albion Crescent (now Dowanside Road), Dowanhill, Glasgow at 11:45 p.m., 24 December 1872, age 52. He was unmarried and had no children. His death was registered by his uncle, Alex Grahame (his late mother's brother in law).

== Thermodynamics ==
Rankine studied the mechanics of the heat engine. Though his theory of circulating streams of elastic vortices whose volumes spontaneously adapted to their environment sounds fanciful to scientists formed on a modern account, by 1849, he had succeeded in finding the relationship between saturated vapour pressure and temperature. The following year, he used his theory to establish relationships between the temperature, pressure and density of gases, and expressions for the latent heat of evaporation of a liquid. He accurately predicted the surprising fact that the apparent specific heat of saturated steam would be negative.

Emboldened by his success, in 1851 he set out to calculate the efficiency of heat engines and used his theory as a basis to deduce the principle, that the maximum efficiency possible for any heat engine is a function only of the two temperatures between which it operates. Though a similar result had already been derived by Rudolf Clausius and William Thomson, Rankine claimed that his result rested upon his hypothesis of molecular vortices alone, rather than upon Carnot's theory or some other additional assumption. The work marked the first step on Rankine's journey to develop a more complete theory of heat. In 1853, he coined the term potential energy.

Rankine later recast the results of his molecular theories in terms of a macroscopic account of energy and its transformations. He defined and distinguished between actual energy which was lost in dynamic processes and potential energy by which it was replaced. He assumed the sum of the two energies to be constant, an idea already, although surely not for very long, familiar in the law of conservation of energy. From 1854, he made wide use of his thermodynamic function which he later realised was identical to the entropy of Clausius. By 1855, Rankine had formulated a science of energetics which gave an account of dynamics in terms of energy and its transformations rather than force and motion. This article presents the first published definition of energy in terms of capacity for performing work, which quickly became the standard general definition of energy. The theory was very influential in the 1890s. In 1859 he proposed the Rankine scale of temperature, an absolute or thermodynamic scale whose degree is equal to a Fahrenheit degree. In 1862, Rankine expanded Lord Kelvin's theory of universal heat death and, along with Kelvin himself, formulated the heat death paradox, which disproves the possibility of an infinitely old universe.

Energetics offered Rankine an alternative, and rather more mainstream, approach, to his science and, from the mid-1850s, he made rather less use of his molecular vortices. Yet he still claimed that Maxwell's work on electromagnetics was effectively an extension of his model. And, in 1864, he contended that the microscopic theories of heat proposed by Clausius and James Clerk Maxwell, based on linear atomic motion, were inadequate. It was only in 1869 that Rankine admitted the success of these rival theories. By that time, his own model of the atom had become almost identical with that of Thomson.

As was his constant aim, especially as a teacher of engineering, he used his own theories to develop a number of practical results and to elucidate their physical principles including:

- The Rankine–Hugoniot equation for propagation of shock waves, governs the behaviour of shock waves normal to the oncoming flow. It is named after physicists Rankine and the French engineer Pierre Henri Hugoniot;
- The Rankine cycle, an analysis of an ideal heat-engine with a condensor. Like other thermodynamic cycles, the maximum efficiency of the Rankine cycle is given by calculating the maximum efficiency of the Carnot cycle;
- Properties of steam, gases and vapours.

The history of rotordynamics is replete with the interplay of theory and practice. Rankine first performed an analysis of a spinning shaft in 1869, but his model was not adequate and he predicted that supercritical speeds could not be attained.

== Fatigue studies ==
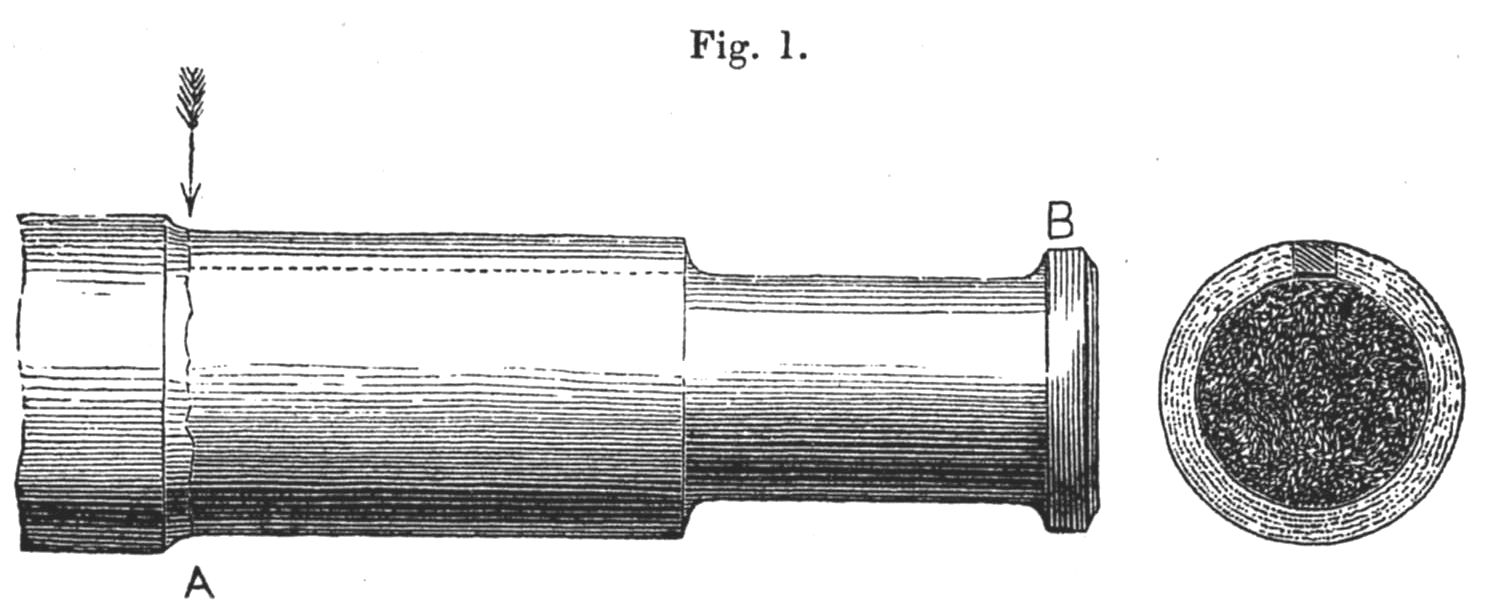
Drawing of a fatigue failure in an axle, 1843

Rankine was one of the first engineers to recognise that fatigue failures of railway axles was caused by the initiation and growth of brittle cracks. In the early 1840s he examined many broken axles, especially after the Versailles train crash of 1842 when a locomotive axle suddenly fractured and led to the death of over 50 passengers. He showed that the axles had failed by progressive growth of a brittle crack from a shoulder or other stress concentration source on the shaft, such as a keyway. He was supported by similar direct analysis of failed axles by Joseph Glynn, where the axles failed by slow growth of a brittle crack in a process now known as metal fatigue. It was likely that the front axle of one of the locomotives involved in the Versailles train crash failed in a similar way. Rankine presented his conclusions in a paper delivered to the Institution of Civil Engineers. His work was ignored however, by many engineers who persisted in believing that stress could cause "re-crystallisation" of the metal, a myth which has persisted even to recent times. The theory of recrystallisation was quite wrong, and inhibited worthwhile research until the work of William Fairbairn a few years later, which showed the weakening effect of repeated flexure on large beams. Nevertheless, fatigue remained a serious and poorly understood phenomenon, and was the root cause of many accidents on the railways and elsewhere. It is still a serious problem, but at least is much better understood today, and so can be prevented by careful design.

== Other work ==
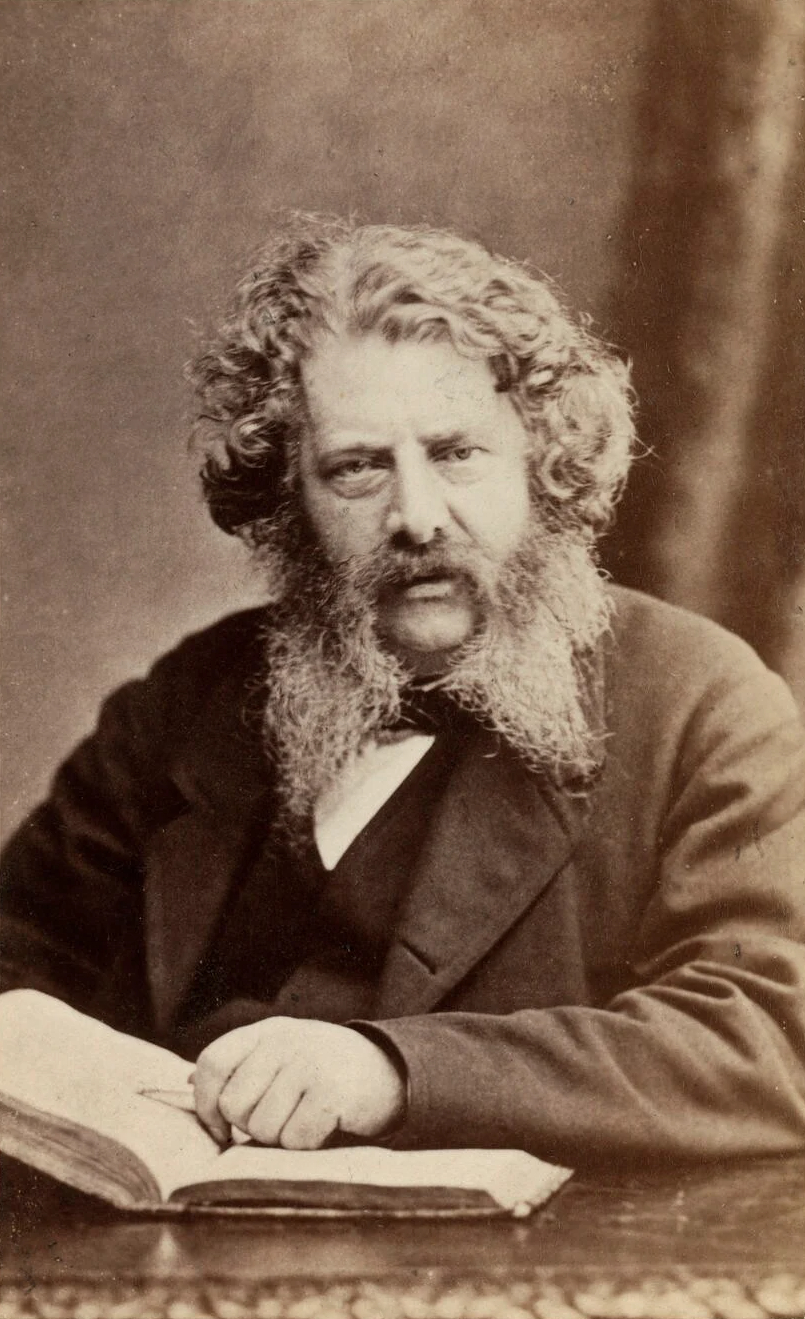
Rankine in the 1870s

Rankine served as Regius Professor of Civil Engineering and Mechanics at the University of Glasgow from November 1855 until his death in December 1872, pursuing engineering research along a number of lines in civil and mechanical engineering.

Rankine was instrumental in the formation of the forerunner of Glasgow University Officer Training Corps, the 2nd Lanarkshire Rifle Volunteer Corps at Glasgow University in July 1859, becoming Major in 1860 after it was formed into the first company of the 2nd Battalion, 1st Lanarkshire Rifle Volunteer Corps; he served until 1864, when he resigned due to pressure of work – much of it associated with Naval Architecture.

=== Civil engineering ===
The Rankine Lectures, organised by the British Geotechnical Association, are named in recognition of the significant contributions Rankine made to:

- Forces in frame structures;
- Soil mechanics; most notably in lateral earth pressure theory and the stabilization of retaining walls. The Rankine method of earth pressure analysis is named after him.

=== Naval architecture ===
Rankine worked closely with Clyde shipbuilders, especially his friend and lifelong collaborator James Robert Napier, to make naval architecture into an engineering science. He was a founding member, and first President of the Institution of Engineers & Shipbuilders in Scotland in 1857. He was an early member of the Royal Institution of Naval Architects (founded 1860) and attended many of its annual meetings. With William Thomson and others, Rankine was a member of the board of enquiry into the controversial sinking of HMS Captain.

== Awards and honours ==
- Fellow of the Royal Scottish Society of Arts
- Associate of the Institution of Civil Engineers, 1843 (he was never a full Member)
- Fellow of the Royal Society of Edinburgh, 1850
- Fellow of the Royal Society of London, 1853
- Keith Medal of the Royal Society of Edinburgh, 1854
- Founding President of the Institution of Engineers and Shipbuilders in Scotland, 1857
- LL.D. from Trinity College, Dublin, 1857
- Elected to membership of the Manchester Literary and Philosophical Society on 19 April 1859
- Foreign member of the Royal Swedish Academy of Sciences, 1868
- The Rankine absolute Fahrenheit scale is named in his honour.
- Rankine, a small impact crater near the eastern limb of the Moon, is also named in his honour.
- In 2013 he was one of four inductees to the Scottish Engineering Hall of Fame.

== Publications ==
Books

- A Manual of Applied Mechanics (1858)
- A Manual of the Steam Engine and Other Prime Movers (1859)
- A Manual of Civil Engineering (1861)
- Shipbuilding, Theoretical and Practical (1866)
- A Manual of Machinery and Millwork (1869)
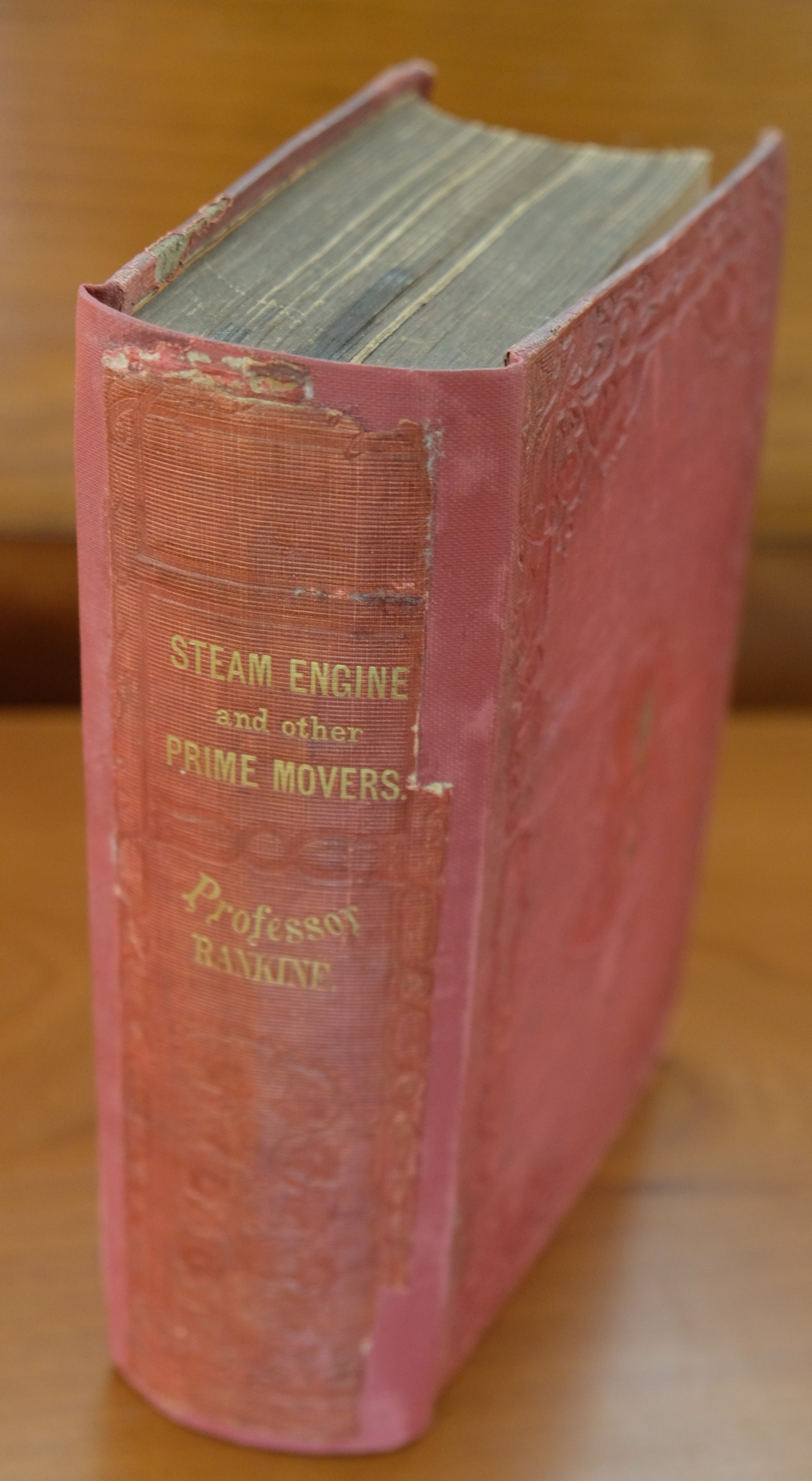
1859 copy of A Manual of the Steam Engine and Other Prime Movers

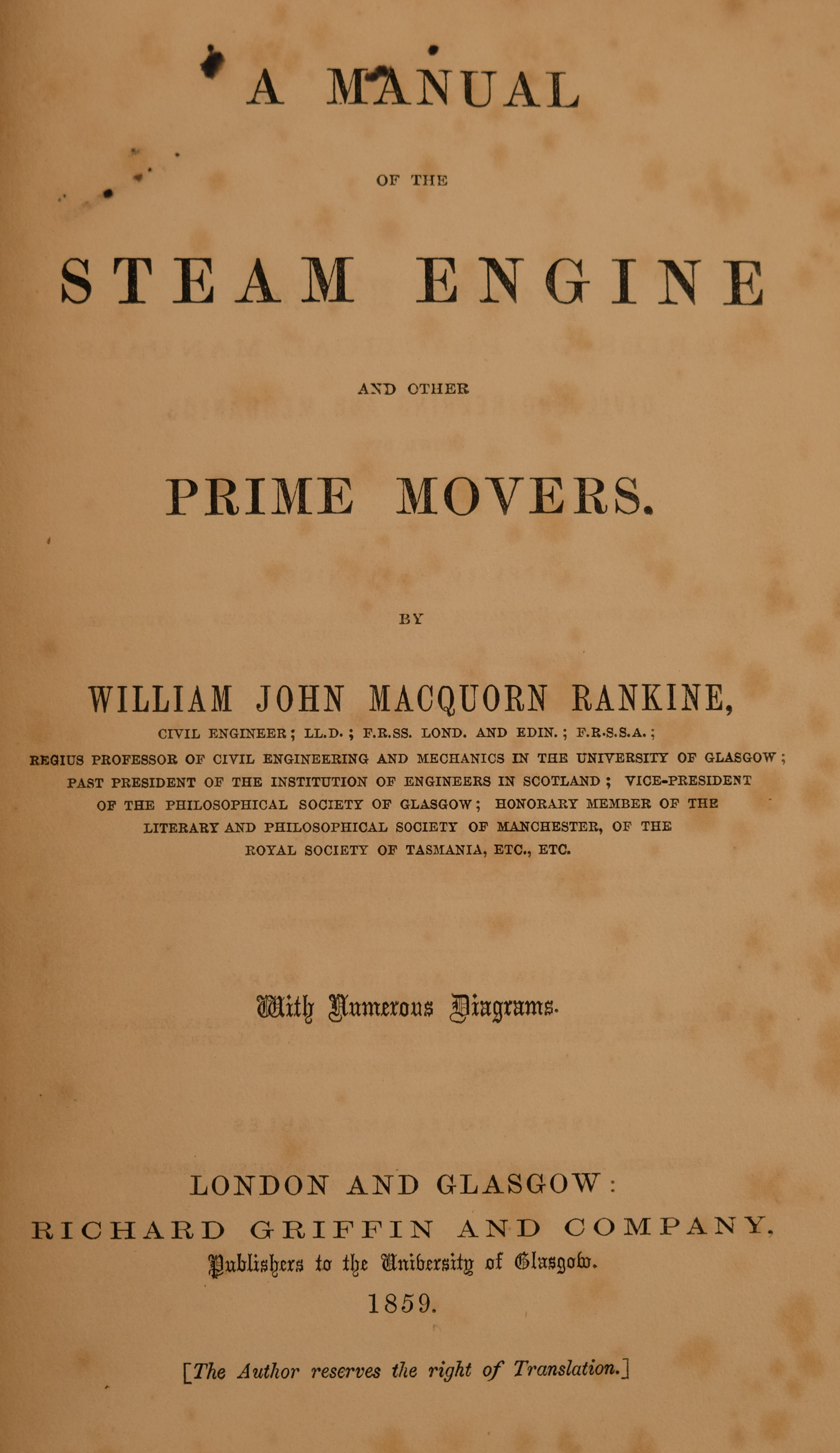
Title page to A Manual of the Steam Engine and Other Prime Movers (1859)

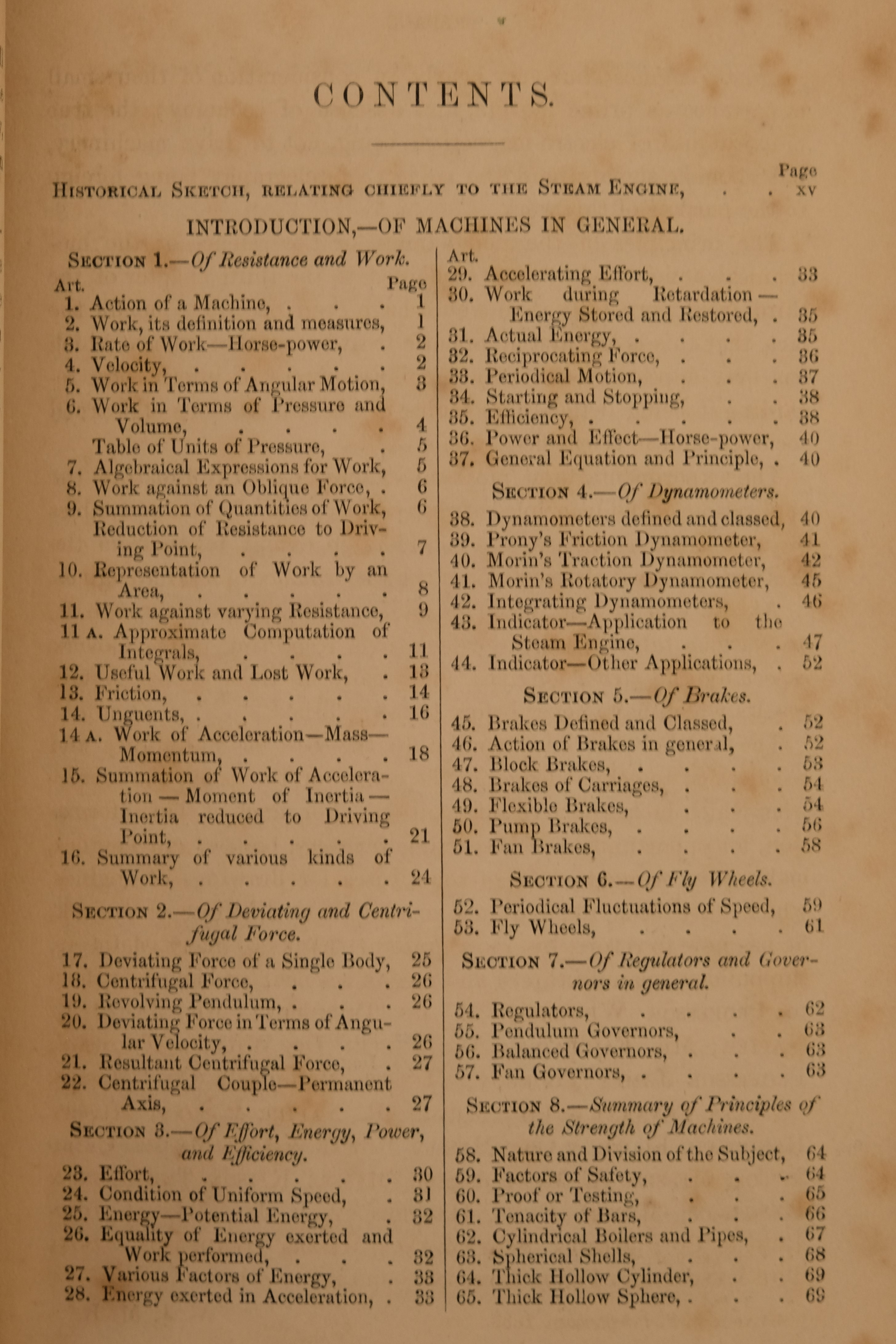
Table of contents to A Manual of the Steam Engine and Other Prime Movers (1859)

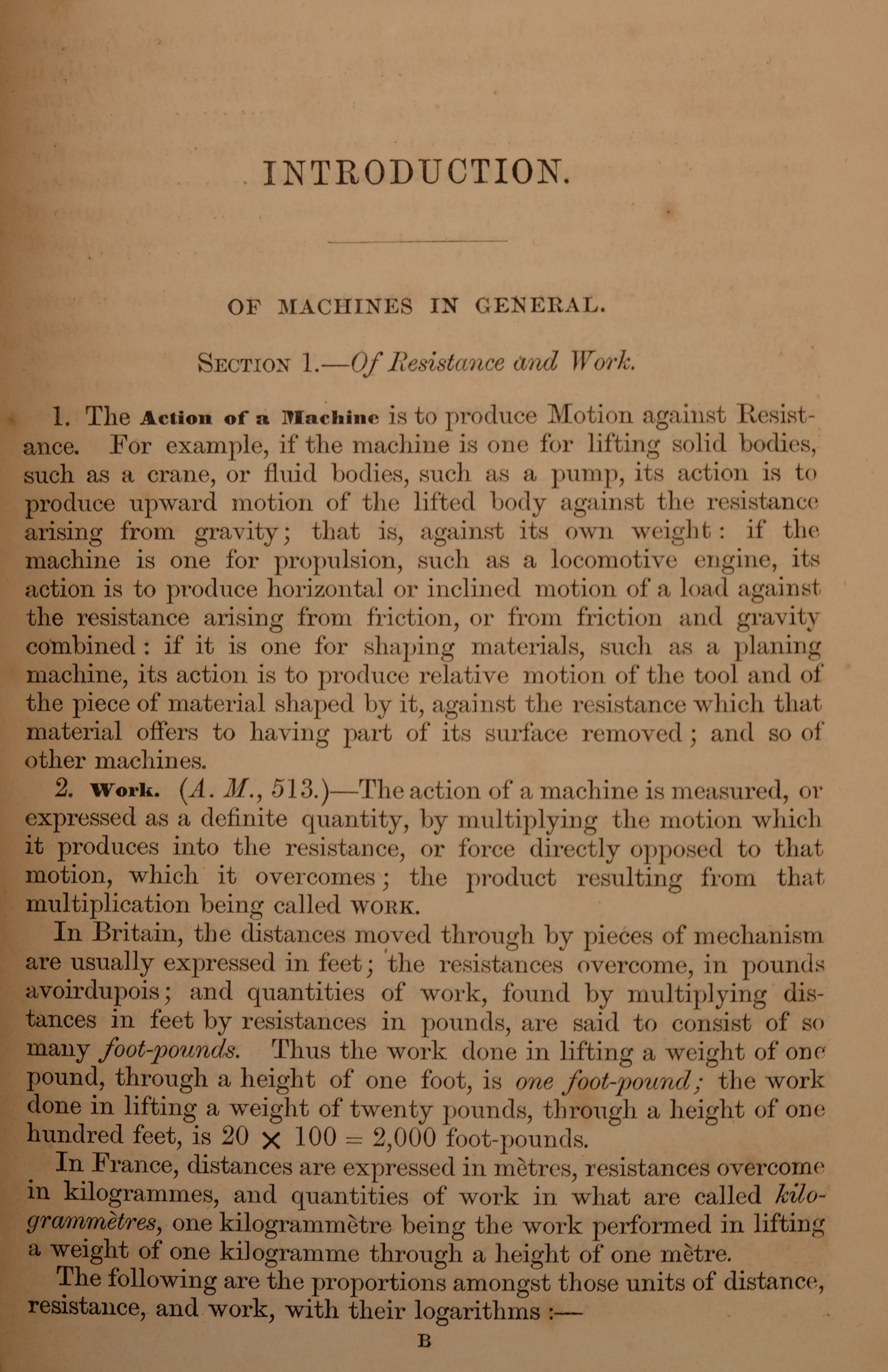
Introduction to A Manual of the Steam Engine and Other Prime Movers (1859)

Papers

- On the Mechanical Action of Heat, Especially in Gases and Vapours (1850), read at the Royal Society of Edinburgh, 4 February 1850
- On the General Law of Transformation of Energy (1853), read at the Glasgow Philosophical Society
- On the Thermodynamic Theory of Waves of Finite Longitudinal Disturbance (1869)
- Outlines of the Science of Energetics (1855), read at the Glasgow Philosophical Society

- This essay inspired William Thomson and P. G. Tait to write Treatise on Natural Philosophy (1867).
- It also influenced French physicist Pierre Duhem's Traité de l'énergétique (1911) in which he considered thermodynamics, not classical mechanics, to be the more fundamental theory.

About Rankine

- Rankine, William John MacQuorn (1881). Miscellaneous Scientific Papers. London: Charles Griffin and Company.

== See also ==
- Momentum theory
- State function
- Track transition curve
- Weighted catenary
