= Rankin Barn =

Rankin Barn may refer to:

- Rebecca Rankin Round Barn, Poling, Indiana, on the National Register of Historic Places
- Rankin Octagonal Barn, Silverton, West Virginia, on the National Register of Historic Places

== See also ==
- Rankin House (disambiguation)
