= Ranken =

Surname

Ranken is a name of Scottish and Irish origin. The name is cognate with the surname Rankin which is derived from the medieval personal name Rankin, a diminutive of Ronald or Rand, combined with the diminutive suffix kin. It may refer to:

- Andrew Ranken (1953-2026), English drummer, percussionist for the English-Irish band The Pogues
- Charles Ranken (1828–1905), Church of England clergyman, minor British chess master
- Harry Sherwood Ranken VC (1883–1914), Scottish recipient of the Victoria Cross
- Mary Cohan Ranken or Mary Cohan (1909–1983), Broadway composer and lyricist, daughter of George M. Cohan
- Mary Ranken Jordan (1869–1962), American philanthropist, advocate of many charitable organizations
- Ted Ranken (1875–1950), British sport shooter, competed in the 1908 Summer Olympics
- Thomas Ranken Lyle FRS (1860–1944), Irish-born and educated mathematical physicist and educator
- William Bruce Ellis Ranken (1881–1941), English painter

== See also ==
- Ranken dart, air-dropped weapon developed during World War I for destroying Zeppelins
- Ranken Jordan – A Pediatric Specialty Hospital, in the United States
- Ranken Technical College, private college in St. Louis, Missouri
- Thomas Ranken Lyle Medal, awarded by the Australian Academy of Science to a mathematician or physicist
- Ranker
- Rankin (disambiguation)
- Rankine (disambiguation)
