= Renken =

Renken is a surname. Notable people with the surname include:

- Brian Renken (born 1955), Canadian wrestler
- Charles Renken (born 1993), American soccer player
- Robert H. Renken (1921–2018), American politician

== See also ==
- Ranken
