= Rankine body =

The Rankine body, discovered by Scottish physicist and engineer William Rankine, is a feature of naval architecture involving the flow of liquid around a body/surface.

In fluid mechanics, a fluid flow pattern formed by combining a uniform stream with a source and a sink of equal strengths, with the line joining the source and sink along the stream direction, conforms to the shape of a Rankine body.

== See also ==
- Rankine half body
