= John Rankin House =

John Rankin House may refer to:

- John Rankin House (Brooklyn), listed on the National Register of Historic Places (NRHP) in Kings County
- John Rankin House (Ripley, Ohio), listed on the NRHP in Brown County

== See also ==
- Rankin House (disambiguation)
