= Lamb–Oseen vortex =

Line vortex

In fluid dynamics, the Lamb–Oseen vortex models a line vortex that decays due to viscosity. This vortex is named after Horace Lamb and Carl Wilhelm Oseen.

Vector plot of the Lamb–Oseen vortex velocity field.

Evolution of a Lamb–Oseen vortex in air in real time. Free-floating test particles reveal the velocity and vorticity pattern. (scale: image is 20 cm wide)

== Mathematical description ==
Oseen looked for a solution for the Navier–Stokes equations in cylindrical coordinates $(r,\theta,z)$ with velocity components $(v_r,v_\theta,v_z)$ of the form

$$v_r=0, \quad v_\theta=\frac{\Gamma}{2\pi r}g(r,t), \quad v_z=0.$$

where $\Gamma$ is the circulation of the vortex core. Navier–Stokes equations lead to

$$\frac{\partial g}{\partial t} = \nu\left(\frac{\partial^2 g}{\partial r^2} - \frac{1}{r} \frac{\partial g}{\partial r}\right)$$

which, subject to the conditions that it is regular at $r=0$ and becomes unity as $r\rightarrow\infty$, leads to

$$g(r,t) = 1-\mathrm{e}^{-r^2/4\nu t},$$

where $\nu$ is the kinematic viscosity of the fluid. At $t=0$, we have a potential vortex (free or irrotational vortex) with concentrated vorticity at the $z$-axis; and this vorticity diffuses away as time passes.

The only non-zero vorticity component is in the $z$-direction, given by

$$\omega_z(r,t) = \frac{\Gamma}{4\pi \nu t} \mathrm{e}^{-r^2/4\nu t}.$$

The pressure field simply ensures the vortex rotates in the circumferential direction, providing the centripetal force

$${\partial p \over \partial r} = \rho {v^2 \over r},$$

where $\rho$ is the constant density. Below are two methods by which Oseen's vortex can be derived.

Derivation of the Lamb-Oseen vortex in polar coordinates

We begin with the polar coordinate $(r,\theta)\in \mathbb{R}^2$ vector field, $\vec{v}=\left( 0, v_{\theta} \right)$ in which the azimuthal momentum equation reduces to the advectionless form,
$$\frac{\partial v_\theta}{\partial t} = \nu \left(\frac{\partial^2 v_\theta}{\partial r^2}+\frac{1}{r}\frac{\partial v_\theta}{\partial r} -\frac{v_\theta}{r^2}\right)$$
which is subject to the following boundary conditions:
$$\begin{Bmatrix} v_{\theta} (0,t)= 0  ,& v_{\theta}(r\to \infty ,t)=0 \\ v_{\theta}(r,0)=\frac{\Gamma}{2\pi r} ,&  v_{\theta}(r,t\to \infty)=0 \end{Bmatrix}$$
By the substitution, $v_\theta (r,t)=\frac{\Gamma}{2\pi r}g(r,t)$, given some unknown $g : \mathbb{R}^2 \to \mathbb{R}^2$, we have,

$$\begin{align}
\frac{\partial v_\theta}{\partial t}&=\nu \left(\frac{\partial^2 v_\theta}{\partial r^2}+\frac{1}{r}\frac{\partial v_\theta}{\partial r} -\frac{v_\theta}{r^2}\right)\\
\iff\  \frac{\partial}{\partial t}\left( \frac{\Gamma}{2\pi r}g(r,t)\right) &=\nu \left(\frac{\partial^2}{\partial r^2}\left( \frac{\Gamma}{2\pi r}g(r,t)\right)+\frac{1}{r}\frac{\partial}{\partial r}\left( \frac{\Gamma}{2\pi r}g(r,t)\right) -\frac{1}{r^2}\frac{\Gamma}{2\pi r}g(r,t)\right)\\
\iff\    \frac{\Gamma}{2\pi r}\frac{\partial g}{\partial t} &=\nu \left(\left( 2\frac{\Gamma}{2\pi r^3}g -\frac{\Gamma}{2\pi r^2}\frac{\partial g}{\partial r} -\frac{\Gamma}{2\pi r^2}\frac{\partial g}{\partial r}+\frac{\Gamma}{2\pi r}\frac{\partial^2 g}{\partial r^2}  \right)+\frac{1}{r} \left( -\frac{\Gamma}{2\pi r^2}g +\frac{\Gamma}{2\pi r}\frac{\partial g}{\partial r} \right) -\frac{1}{r^2}\frac{\Gamma}{2\pi r}g\right)\\
\iff\ \frac{\partial g}{\partial t} &=\nu \left(\left( \frac{2}{r^2}g -\frac{2}{r}\frac{\partial g}{\partial r} + \frac{\partial^2 g}{\partial r^2}  \right)+\frac{1}{r} \left( -\frac{1}{r}g +\frac{\partial g}{\partial r} \right) -\frac{1}{r^2}g\right)\\
\therefore\ \frac{\partial g}{\partial t} &=\nu \left( \frac{\partial^2 g}{\partial r^2} - \frac{1}{r}\frac{\partial g}{\partial r} \right)
\end{align}$$
We can invoke a self-similar solution, $g(r,t)=f(\eta)$ with $\eta =r / \varphi(t)$, and obtain the following derivatives using the chain rule:
$$\begin{align}
\frac{\partial g}{\partial t} &:= \frac{\mathrm{d} f}{\mathrm{d} \eta}\frac{\partial \eta}{\partial t} = -f' \frac{r}{\varphi(t)^2}\varphi'(t)\\
\frac{1}{r}\frac{\partial g}{\partial r}&:=\frac{1}{r}\frac{\mathrm{d} f}{\mathrm{d} \eta}\frac{\partial \eta}{\partial r} = \frac{ f'}{r\varphi(t)}\\
\frac{\partial^2 g}{\partial r^2} &:=\frac{\partial }{\partial r}\left( \frac{\mathrm{d} f}{\mathrm{d} \eta}\frac{\partial \eta}{\partial r} \right) =\frac{\mathrm{d} f}{\mathrm{d} \eta}\underbrace{\frac{\partial}{\partial r}\left ( \frac{\partial \eta}{\partial r} \right ) }_{=0} + \frac{\partial \eta}{\partial r}\frac{\partial }{\partial r}\left ( \frac{\mathrm{d} f}{\mathrm{d} \eta} \right ) = \frac{\partial \eta}{\partial r} \cdot \frac{\mathrm{d}^2 f}{\mathrm{d} \eta^2} \frac{\partial \eta}{\partial r} = \frac{f''}{\varphi(t)^2}
\end{align}$$
By substitution, it follows that
$$\begin{align}    -f'\frac{r}{\varphi^2} \varphi' =\nu \left( \frac{f''}{\varphi^2} -\frac{ f'}{r\varphi} \right)\\    \iff\  f'' + \left( \eta \frac{\varphi \varphi'}{\nu}-\frac{1}{\eta} \right)f' =0 \end{align}$$
If $\frac{\varphi \varphi'}{\nu}=1$, then $\varphi(t) =\sqrt{2\nu t}$, and hence,
$$\begin{align}
\frac{\mathrm{d}^2 f}{\mathrm{d}\eta^2} &= -\left( \eta -\frac{1}{\eta} \right)\frac{\mathrm{d}f}{\mathrm{d}\eta} \ \ \text{, where,} \ \ u(\eta)=f'(\eta)\\
\iff\ \frac{\mathrm{d} u}{\mathrm{d}\eta} &= -\left( \eta-\frac{1}{\eta} \right)u \\
\iff\ \int \frac{\mathrm{d} u}{u} &= -\int \left( \eta-\frac{1}{\eta} \right)\mathrm{d}\eta \\
\iff\ \ln(u) &= - \left( \frac{\eta^2}{2}-\ln(\eta) \right)+C \\
\iff\ u(\eta) &= A e^{-\frac{\eta^2}{2}+\ln(\eta)} \ \ \ \text{, where,}\ \ A= e^C \\
\iff\ f'(\eta) &= A \eta \ e^{-\frac{\eta^2}{2}} \\
\iff\ f(\eta) &= A \int \eta \ e^{-\frac{\eta^2}{2}} \mathrm{d}\eta \ \ \text{, where,} \ \  p=-\frac{\eta^2}{2} \ \ ,\ \ \mathrm{d}p=-\eta \ \mathrm{d}\eta \\
\iff\ f(\eta) &= A \int \eta \left( -\frac{1}{\eta} \right)e^{p} \mathrm{d} p \\
\iff\ f(\eta) &= -A e^{-\frac{\eta^2}{2}} +B \\
\therefore \ g(r,t) &= B-A e^{-\frac{r^2}{4\nu t}}
\end{align}$$
The first boundary condition, $v_{\theta}(0,t)=0$, infers that $g(0,t)=0$, which holds if and only if $\displaystyle \lim_{r \to 0}\frac{\Gamma}{2\pi r}g(r,t)=0$. Verifying by L'Hôpital's rule,
$$\begin{align}
\displaystyle \lim_{r \to 0}\frac{\Gamma}{2\pi r}g(r,t) =\frac{\Gamma}{2\pi }\cdot \displaystyle \lim_{r \to 0}\frac{-A e^{-\frac{r^2}{4\nu t}} +B}{r} =\frac{\Gamma}{2\pi }\cdot \displaystyle \lim_{r \to 0}\frac{\frac{\mathrm{d}}{\mathrm{d}r}\left(-A e^{-\frac{r^2}{4\nu t}}+B\right)}{\frac{\mathrm{d}}{\mathrm{d}r}(r)} =\frac{\Gamma A}{2\pi } \cdot\displaystyle \lim_{r \to 0} \left(\frac{r}{2\nu t}e^{-\frac{r^2}{4\nu t}} \right) = 0
\end{align}$$
The second boundary condition, $v_\theta (r\to \infty,t)=0$, is satisfied by the irrotational vortex, $\displaystyle \lim_{r \to \infty} \frac{\Gamma}{2\pi r}=0$, for all $t$. Given the third boundary condition, $v_\theta (r,0)=\frac{\Gamma}{2\pi r}$, it follows that $g(r,0)=B=1$. Likewise, $\forall r \in [0,\infty)$, the fourth boundary condition, $v_\theta (r,t\to \infty)=0$, implies that $\displaystyle \lim_{t \to \infty}\frac{\Gamma}{2\pi r}\left(B-A e^{-\frac{r^2}{4\nu t}} \right)=0$, such that $B=A$. Therefore, the solution becomes
$$\begin{align}
v_\theta (r,t) = \frac{\Gamma}{2\pi r}\left( 1-e^{-\frac{r^2}{4\nu t}}\right) .
\end{align}$$

Alternative derivation of the Lamb-Oseen vortex by the vorticity equation

Given the vorticity vector, $\boldsymbol{\omega}=\left( 0,0,\omega_z \right)$, the $z$-component of the linearized vorticity transport equation is
$$\begin{align}
\frac{\partial \omega_{z}}{\partial t}=\nu \left(\frac{\partial^2 \omega_{z}}{\partial r^2}+\frac{1}{r}\frac{\partial \omega_{z}}{\partial r}\right).
\end{align}$$
If one insists on invoking the similarity solution, $\omega_{z} (r,t)=f(\eta)$ with $\eta=r/ \sqrt{2\nu t}$ as done previously, one would exclusively obtain $\omega_{z}(r,t)=A \operatorname{Ei}\left( -\frac{r^2}{4\nu t}\right)+B$ for arbitrary constants, $A$ and $B$. To obtain the complete solution to $\omega_{z}$, one must introduce the similarity solution, $\omega_{z} (r,t)=f(\eta)/t$ with $\eta =r/ \sqrt{4\nu t}$. By the product rule and the chain rule, each derivative becomes,

$$\begin{align}
\frac{\partial \omega_z}{\partial t} &:= \frac{\partial }{\partial t}\left(\frac{f}{t} \right)=f\frac{\partial}{\partial t}\left(\frac{1}{t}\right) +\frac{\mathrm{d} f}{\mathrm{d} \eta}\frac{\partial \eta}{\partial t} = -\frac{1}{t^2}f-\frac{2\nu r}{t(4\nu t)^{3/2}}f'\\
\frac{1}{r}\frac{\partial \omega_z}{\partial r} &:=\frac{1}{rt}\frac{\mathrm{d} f}{\mathrm{d} \eta}\frac{\partial \eta}{\partial r} = f' \frac{1}{rt\sqrt{4\nu t}}\\
\frac{\partial^2 \omega_z}{\partial r^2} &:=\frac{\partial }{\partial r}\left( \frac{1}{t}\frac{\mathrm{d} f}{\mathrm{d} \eta}\frac{\partial \eta}{\partial r} \right) = \frac{1}{t}\frac{\mathrm{d} f}{\mathrm{d} \eta}\underbrace{\frac{\partial}{\partial r}\left ( \frac{\partial \eta}{\partial r} \right ) }_{=0}
+ \frac{1}{t}\frac{\partial \eta}{\partial r}\frac{\partial }{\partial r}\left ( \frac{\mathrm{d} f}{\mathrm{d} \eta} \right ) = \frac{1}{t}\frac{\partial \eta}{\partial r} \cdot \frac{\mathrm{d}^2 f}{\mathrm{d} \eta^2} \frac{\partial \eta}{\partial r} = f'' \frac{1}{4\nu t^2}
\end{align}$$
yielding the Sturm–Liouville differential equation,
$$\begin{align}
f'' + \left(\frac{1}{\eta}+2\eta \right)f' +4f = 0.
\end{align}$$
Because this is a differential equation of the form,
$$\begin{align}
y'' +f(x)y' +g(x)y &=0 \\
\equiv\ xy'' + \frac{d}{dx}\left[ \left( xf(x)\right)y \right] &=0 \ \ \ \text{, where,} \ \ g(x)=\frac{1}{x}\frac{\mathrm{d}}{\mathrm{d}x}\left[ xf(x) \right]
\end{align}$$
for some function, $y(x)$, it admits the solution,
$$\begin{align}
y(x) &= Ce^{-\int \left[ f(x) - \frac{g(x)-f'(x)}{f(x)} \right] \mathrm{d}x}\int e^{\int \left[ f(x) - 2\frac{g(x)-f'(x)}{f(x)} \right] \mathrm{d}x} \mathrm{d}x \\
&= Cx e^{-\int f(x) \mathrm{d}x}\int \frac{1}{x^2}e^{ \int f(x) \mathrm{d}x} \mathrm{d}x
\end{align}$$
This can be checked by multiplying through by $\eta$ and using integration by parts as follows:
$$\begin{align}
0 &= \eta \left( f'' + \frac{1}{\eta}f' + 2\eta f' +4f \right) \\
\iff\ C &= \int \eta f'' d\eta + \int f' d\eta +\int 2\eta^2 f' d\eta + \int 4\eta f d\eta \\
\iff\ C&= \left(\eta f' - \int f' d\eta \right) + \int f' d\eta  + \left(2\eta^2 f- \int 4\eta f d\eta \right) + \int 4\eta f d\eta \\
\iff\ C&= \eta f' + 2\eta^2 f \\
\iff\ f' + 2\eta f &= \frac{C}{\eta} \ \ \ \text{, with an integrating factor,}\ \  p(\eta)=e^{\int 2\eta d\eta}=e^{\eta^2}\\
\iff\ e^{\eta^2}f'+ 2\eta e^{\eta^2} f &= C\frac{e^{\eta^2}}{\eta} \\
\iff\ \frac{d}{d\eta}\left( e^{\eta^2} f\right) &= C\frac{e^{\eta^2}}{\eta} \\
\iff\ e^{\eta^2} f &= C\int \frac{e^{\eta^2}}{\eta}d\eta \\
\therefore\ f(\eta) &= C \operatorname{Ei}(\eta^2)e^{-\eta^2} +C_1e^{-\eta^2}
\end{align}$$
Because $\displaystyle \lim_{\eta\to 0} \operatorname{Ei}(\eta^2)$ is not well defined, $C=0$. Substituting $\eta$ and $f(\eta)$ into $\omega_{z} (r,t)=f(\eta)/t$ yields,
$$\begin{align}
\omega_z (r,t)= \frac{C_1}{t}e^{-\frac{r^2}{4\nu t}}
\end{align}$$
The circulation flux integral over a surface, $S =\left\{ (r,\theta)\in \mathbb{R}^2 \ | \ 0\leq r \leq \infty ,\ 0\leq \theta \leq 2\pi \right\}$, may be solved for constant circulation, $\Gamma$.
$$\begin{align}
\Gamma := \iint_{S} \boldsymbol{\omega} \cdot \mathrm{d}\boldsymbol{S} &= \int_{0}^{2\pi}\int_{0}^{\infty} \omega_z \cdot r\mathrm{d}r \mathrm{d}\theta\\
&= 2\pi\int_{0}^{\infty} \frac{C_1}{t}e^{-\frac{r^2}{4\nu t}} \cdot r \mathrm{d}r \\
&= 4\pi \nu C_1 \int_{0}^{\infty} e^{-u}  \mathrm{d}u  \ \ \ \text{where,} \ \ \ u=\frac{r^2}{4\nu t} \\
\therefore C_1 &= \frac{\Gamma}{4\pi \nu }.
\end{align}$$
Since,
$$\omega_{z} = \frac{\partial v_\theta}{\partial r}+\frac{v_\theta}{r} -\frac{1}{r}\frac{\partial v_r}{\partial \theta}$$
bearing in mind that $v_r =0$, we can use the integrating factor, $e^{\int \frac{1}{r} dr}=r$, to isolate $v_\theta$.
$$\begin{align}
v_\theta (r,t) &= \frac{1}{r}\int r\omega_{z} \mathrm{d}r \\
&= \frac{\Gamma}{4\pi \nu t} \frac{1}{r}\int r e^{-\frac{r^2}{4\nu t}} \mathrm{d}r \\
&= \frac{\Gamma}{4\pi \nu t} \frac{1}{r}\int r e^{u} \left(-\frac{2\nu t}{r} \right) \mathrm{d}u \ \ \ \text{, where,}\ \  u=-\frac{r^2}{4\nu t} \\
&= \frac{\Gamma}{2\pi r} \left(C_2-e^{-\frac{r^2}{4\nu t}} \right) \\
\end{align}$$
The aforementioned boundary conditions on $v_\theta$ yields the Lamb-Oseen vortex.

== Generalized Oseen vortex ==
The generalized Oseen vortex may be obtained by looking for solutions of the form

$$v_r=-\gamma(t) r, \quad v_\theta= \frac{\Gamma}{2\pi r}g(r,t), \quad v_z = 2\gamma(t) z$$

that leads to the equation

$$\frac{\partial g}{\partial t} -\gamma r\frac{\partial g}{\partial r} = \nu \left(\frac{\partial^2 g}{\partial r^2} - \frac{1}{r} \frac{\partial g}{\partial r}\right).$$

Self-similar solution exists for the coordinate $\eta=r/\varphi(t)$, provided $\varphi\varphi' +\gamma \varphi^2=a$, where $a$ is a constant, in which case $g=1-\mathrm{e}^{-a\eta^2/2\nu}$. The solution for $\varphi(t)$ may be written according to Rott (1958) as

$$\varphi^2= 2a\exp\left(-2\int_0^t\gamma(s)\,\mathrm{d} s\right)\int_c^t\exp\left(2\int_0^u \gamma(s)\,\mathrm{d} s\right)\,\mathrm{d}u,$$

where $c$ is an arbitrary constant. For $\gamma=0$, the classical Lamb–Oseen vortex is recovered. The case $\gamma=k$ corresponds to the axisymmetric stagnation point flow, where $k$ is a constant. When $c=-\infty$, $\varphi^2=a/k$, a Burgers vortex is a obtained. For arbitrary $c$, the solution becomes $\varphi^2=a(1+\beta \mathrm{e}^{-2kt})/k$, where $\beta$ is an arbitrary constant. As $t\rightarrow\infty$, Burgers vortex is recovered.

== See also ==
- Rankine vortex and Kaufmann (Scully) vortex – Common simplified approximations for a viscous vortex.
- Taylor–Green vortex
