= Whitaker, Pennsylvania =

Borough in Pennsylvania, US

- Borough
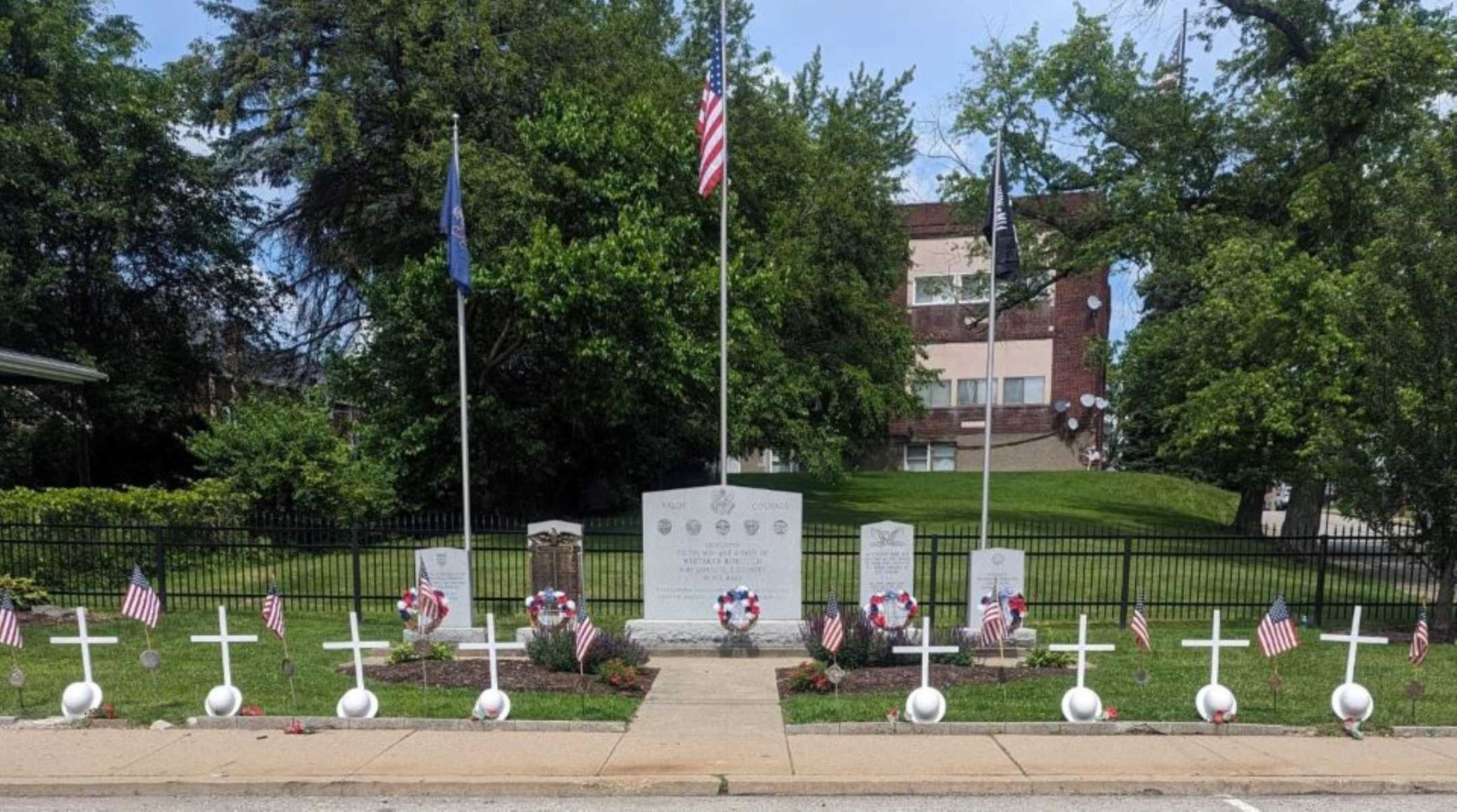
- Whitaker Memorial

- Location in Allegheny County and the U.S. state of Pennsylvania.
- Coordinates: 40°23′58″N 79°53′12″W
- Country: United States
- State: Pennsylvania
- County: Allegheny

Government
  - Mayor: Kathy Asson
  - Council President: David Funk
  - Council Vice President: Bob Silvasy
  - Borough Secretary: Michelle Lippert
  - Police Chief: Ozie Sparks

Area
  - Total: 0.33 sq mi (0.85 km^{2})
  - Land: 0.30 sq mi (0.77 km^{2})
  - Water: 0.035 sq mi (0.09 km^{2})

Population (2020)
  - Total: 1,179
  - Estimate (2019): 1,235
  - Density: 4,168.3/sq mi (1,609.38/km^{2})
- Time zone: UTC-5 (Eastern (EST))
  - Summer (DST): UTC-4 (EDT)
- ZIP codes: 15120
- Area code: 412
- FIPS code: 42-84440
- School District: West Mifflin
- Website: https://whitaker.gov/

Whitaker is a borough in Allegheny County, Pennsylvania, United States, and is on the Monongahela River 3 miles (5 km) upriver from Pittsburgh. The population was 1,179 at the 2020 census.

The borough is named for James Whitaker, a pioneer settler. Whitaker was incorporated January 4, 1904, from part of the former Mifflin Township.

== Geography ==
Whitaker is located at 40°23′58″N 79°53′12″W (40.399376, −79.886627).

According to the United States Census Bureau, the borough has a total area of 0.33 square miles (0.85 km^{2}), of which 0.3 square miles (0.78 km^{2}) is land and 0.03 square miles (0.078 km^{2}), or 11.76%, is water.

== Surrounding communities ==
Whitaker has two land borders, including Munhall to the northwest and West Mifflin to the south and east. Across the Monongahela River to the northeast are the boroughs of Braddock and Rankin, the latter with a direct connector via Rankin Bridge.

== Demographics ==
Historical population
Census	Pop.	Note	%±
1910	1,547		—
1920	1,881		21.6%
1930	2,072		10.2%
1940	2,217		7.0%
1950	2,149		−3.1%
1960	2,130		−0.9%
1970	1,797		−15.6%
1980	1,615		−10.1%
1990	1,416		−12.3%
2000	1,338		−5.5%
2010	1,271		−5.0%
2020	1,179		−7.2%

At the 2000 census, there were 1,338 people in 560 households, including 384 families, in the borough. The population density was 4,427.0 inhabitants per square mile (1,709.3/km^{2}). There were 620 housing units at an average density of 2,051.4 per square mile (792.0/km^{2}). The racial makeup of the borough was 93.65% White, 5.01% African American, 0.60% from other races, and 0.75% from two or more races. Hispanic or Latino of any race were 0.52%.

There were 560 households, 28.9% had children under the age of 18 living with them, 47.7% were married couples living together, 15.7% had a female householder with no husband present, and 31.4% were non-families. 28.0% of households were made up of individuals, and 12.1% were one person aged 65 or older. The average household size was 2.39 and the average family size was 2.89.

The age distribution was 23.4% under the age of 18, 6.4% from 18 to 24, 30.0% from 25 to 44, 23.2% from 45 to 64, and 17.0% 65 or older. The median age was 39 years. For every 100 females, there were 101.2 males. For every 100 females age 18 and over, there were 94.1 males.

The median household income was $34,239 and the median family income was $39,250. Males had a median income of $29,152 versus $23,409 for females. The per capita income for the borough was $19,910. About 11.9% of families and 14.6% of the population were below the poverty line, including 20.6% of those under age 18 and 10.2% of those age 65 or over.

== Notable person ==
- Jeff Goldblum, actor

== Government and politics ==
Presidential election results
Year	Republican	Democratic	Third parties
2020	46% (260)	54% (304)	1% (4)
2016	46% (248)	53% (281)	1% (6)
2012	35% (195)	64% (356)	1% (8)
