= Heat death paradox =

Paradox relating to fate of universe

The heat death paradox, also known as thermodynamic paradox, Clausius' paradox, and Kelvin's paradox, is a reductio ad absurdum argument that uses thermodynamics to show the impossibility of an infinitely old universe. It was formulated in February 1862 by Lord Kelvin and expanded upon by Hermann von Helmholtz and William John Macquorn Rankine.

== The paradox ==
Assuming that the universe is eternal, a question arises: How is it that thermodynamic equilibrium has not already been achieved?

This theoretical paradox is directed at the then-mainstream strand of belief in a classical view of a sempiternal universe, whereby its matter is postulated as everlasting and having always been recognisably the universe. The heat death paradox is born of a paradigm resulting from fundamental ideas about the cosmos; it is necessary to change the paradigm to resolve the paradox.

The paradox was based upon the rigid mechanical point of view of the second law of thermodynamics postulated by Rudolf Clausius and Lord Kelvin, according to which heat can only be transferred from a warmer to a colder object. It notes: if the universe were eternal, as claimed classically, it should already be cold and isotropic (its objects should have the same temperature, and the distribution of matter or radiation should be even). Kelvin compared the universe to a clock that runs slower and slower, constantly dissipating energy in impalpable heat, although he was unsure whether it would stop for ever (reach thermodynamic equilibrium). According to this model, the existence of usable energy, which can be used to perform work and produce entropy, means that the clock has not stopped – since a conversion of heat in mechanical energy (which Kelvin called a rejuvenating universe scenario) is not contemplated.

According to the laws of thermodynamics, any hot object transfers heat to its cooler surroundings, until everything is at the same temperature. For two objects at the same temperature as much heat flows from one body as flows from the other, and the net effect is no change. If the universe were infinitely old, there must have been enough time for the stars to cool and warm their surroundings. Everywhere should therefore be at the same temperature and there should either be no stars, or everything should be as hot as stars. The universe should thus achieve, or asymptotically tend to, thermodynamic equilibrium, which corresponds to a state where no thermodynamic free energy is left, and therefore no further work is possible: this is the heat death of the universe, as predicted by Lord Kelvin in 1852. The average temperature of the cosmos should also asymptotically tend to absolute zero, and it is possible that a maximum entropy state will be reached.

== Kelvin's solution ==
In February 1862, Lord Kelvin used the existence of the Sun and the stars as an empirical proof that the universe has not achieved thermodynamic equilibrium, as entropy production and free work are still possible, and there are temperature differences between objects. Helmholtz and Rankine expanded Kelvin's work soon after. Since there are stars and colder objects, the universe is not in thermodynamic equilibrium, so it cannot be infinitely old.

=== Modern cosmology ===
The paradox does not arise in the Big Bang or its successful Lambda-CDM refinement, which posit that the universe began roughly 13.8 billion years ago, not long enough ago for the universe to have approached thermodynamic equilibrium. Some proposed further refinements, termed eternal inflation, restore Kelvin's idea of unending time in the more complicated form of an eternal, exponentially-expanding multiverse in which mutually-inaccessible baby universes, some of which resemble the universe we inhabit, are continually being born.

== Related paradoxes ==
Olbers' paradox is another paradox which aims to disprove an infinitely old static universe, but it only fits with a static universe scenario. Also, unlike Kelvin's paradox, it relies on cosmology rather than thermodynamics. The Boltzmann Brain can also be related to Kelvin's, as it focuses on the spontaneous generation of a brain (filled with false memories) from entropy fluctuations, in a universe which has been lying in a heat death state for an indefinite amount of time.

== See also ==
- Entropy as an arrow of time
- Heat death of the universe
- List of paradoxes
- Thermodynamic temperature
