= Rankin House =

Rankin House or Rankin Barn may refer to:

in the United States (by state then city)

- Green-Rankin-Bembridge House, Long Beach, California, listed on the National Register of Historic Places (NRHP) in Los Angeles County
- Rankin House (Columbus, Georgia), listed on the NRHP in Muscogee County
- Davis-Guttenberger-Rankin House, Macon, Georgia, listed on the NRHP in Bibb County
- Alexander Taylor Rankin House, listed on the NRHP in Allen County
- Rebecca Rankin Round Barn, Poling, Indiana, listed on the NRHP in Jay County
- John N. and Mary L. (Rankin) Irwin House, Keokuk, Iowa, listed on the NRHP in Lee County
- Meade County Clerk Office-Rankin House, Brandenburg, Kentucky, listed on the NRHP in Meade County
- Rankin Place, Lancaster, Kentucky, listed on the NRHP in Garrard County
- Rankin House (Mandeville, Louisiana), listed on the NRHP in St. Tammany Parish
- Rankin Ranch, Avalanche Gulch, Montana, listed on the NRHP in Broadwater County
- John Rankin House (Brooklyn, New York), listed on the NRHP in Kings County
- Holley-Rankine House, Niagara Falls, New York, listed on the NRHP in Niagara County
- Rankin-Sherrill House, Mt. Ulla, North Carolina, listed on the NRHP in Rowan County
- John Rankin House (Ripley, Ohio), a National Historic Landmark and listed on the NRHP in Brown County
- Rankin-Harwell House, Florence, South Carolina, listed on the NRHP in Florence County
- David Rankin House, Greeneville, Tennessee, listed on the NRHP in Greene County
- Rankin Octagonal Barn, Silverton, West Virginia, listed on the NRHP in Jackson County

== See also ==
- Rankin Barn (disambiguation)
- Rankin Building (disambiguation)
- John Rankin House (disambiguation)
