= Kaufmann vortex =

Mathematical model for a vortex that takes viscosity into account

The Kaufmann vortex, also known as the Scully model, is a mathematical model for a vortex taking account of viscosity. It uses an algebraic velocity profile. This vortex is not a solution of the Navier–Stokes equations.

Kaufmann and Scully's model for the velocity in the Θ direction is:

$$V_\Theta\ (r) = \frac{\Gamma}{2\pi} \frac{r}{r_c^2 + r^2}$$

The model was suggested by W. Kaufmann in 1962, and later by Scully and Sullivan in 1972 at the Massachusetts Institute of Technology.

== See also ==
- Rankine vortex – a simpler, but more crude, approximation for a vortex.
- Lamb–Oseen vortex – the exact solution for a free vortex decaying due to viscosity.
