= Rankine vortex =

Mathematical formula for viscous fluid

Velocity distribution in a Rankine vortex.

Animation of a Rankine vortex. Free-floating test particles reveal the velocity and vorticity pattern.

The Rankine vortex is a simple mathematical model of a vortex in a viscous fluid. It is named after its discoverer, William John Macquorn Rankine.

The vortices observed in nature are usually modelled with an irrotational (potential or free) vortex. However, in a potential vortex, the velocity becomes infinite at the vortex center. In reality, very close to the origin, the motion resembles a solid body rotation. The Rankine vortex model assumes a solid-body rotation inside a cylinder of radius $a$ and a potential vortex outside the cylinder. The radius $a$ is referred to as the vortex-core radius. The velocity components $(v_r,v_\theta,v_z)$ of the Rankine vortex, expressed in terms of the cylindrical-coordinate system $(r,\theta,z)$ are given by

$$v_r=0,\quad v_\theta(r) = \frac{\Gamma}{2\pi}\begin{cases}  r/a^2 & r \le a, \\ 1/ r & r > a \end{cases}, \quad v_z = 0$$

where $\Gamma$ is the circulation strength of the Rankine vortex. Since solid-body rotation is characterized by an azimuthal velocity $\Omega r$, where $\Omega$ is the constant angular velocity, the parameter $\Omega =\Gamma/(2\pi a^2)$ can also be used to characterize the vortex.

The vorticity field $(\omega_r,\omega_\theta,\omega_z)$ associated with the Rankine vortex is

$$\omega_r=0,\quad \omega_\theta=0, \quad \omega_z = \begin{cases}  2\Omega & r \le a, \\ 0 & r > a \end{cases}.$$

At all points inside the core of the Rankine vortex, the vorticity is uniform at twice the angular velocity of the core; whereas vorticity is zero at all points outside the core because the flow there is irrotational.

In reality, vortex cores are not always circular; and vorticity is not exactly uniform throughout the vortex core.

== See also ==
- Burgers vortex
- Kaufmann (Scully) vortex – an alternative mathematical simplification for a vortex, with a smoother transition.
- Lamb–Oseen vortex – the exact solution for a free vortex decaying due to viscosity.
