= Rankine (crater) =

Crater on the Moon

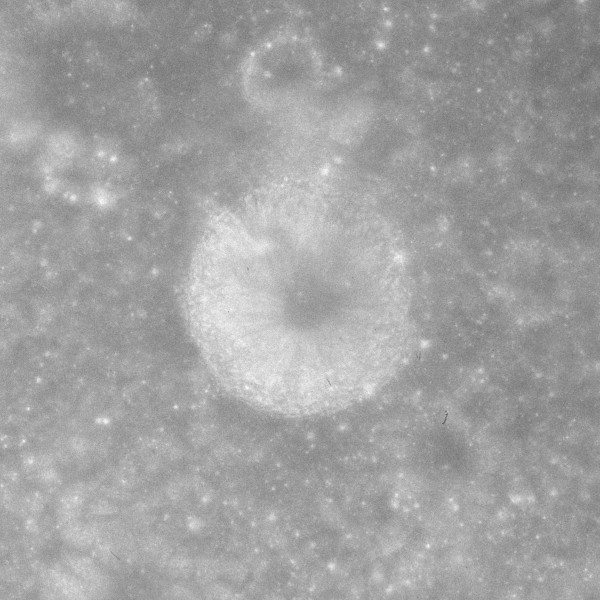
- Apollo 16 image
- Coordinates: 3.9°S 71.5°E
- Diameter: 8 km
- Depth: Unknown
- Colongitude: 291° at sunrise
- Eponym: William J. M. Rankine

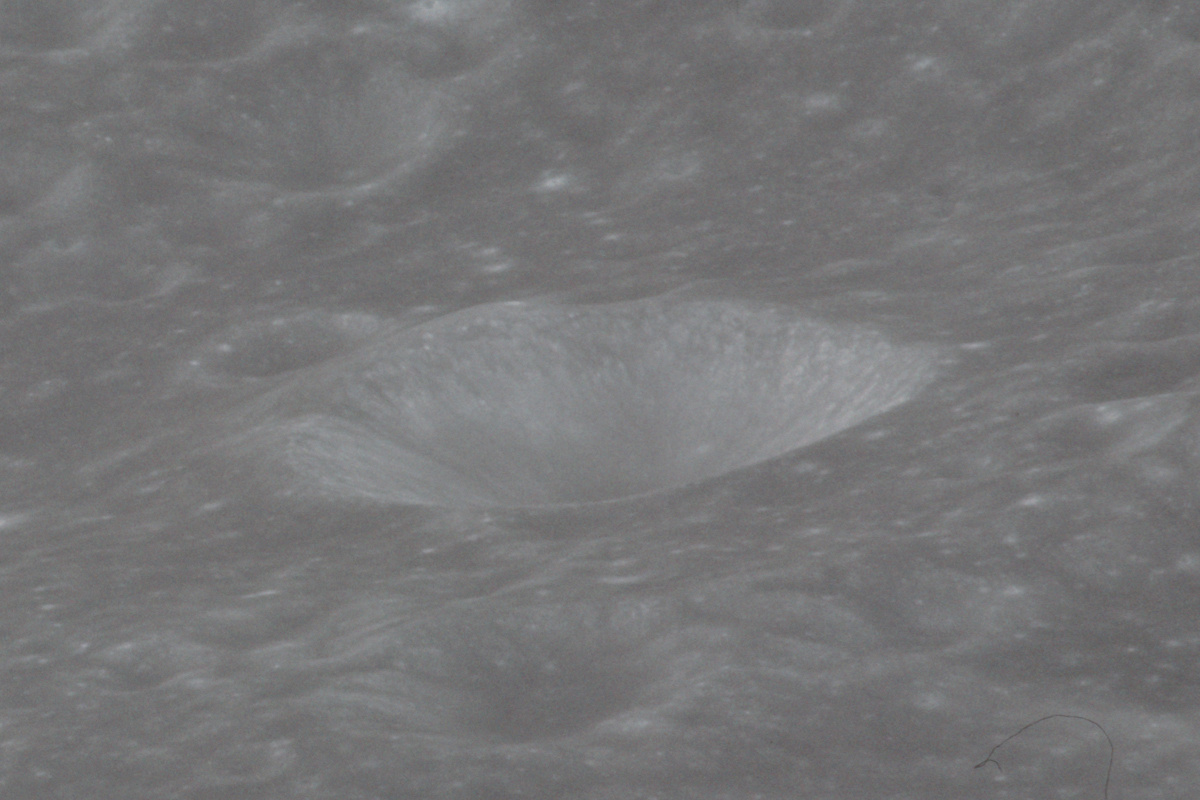
Oblique view from Apollo 14

Rankine is a small lunar impact crater near the eastern limb of the Moon. It lies on the southern floor of the satellite crater Maclaurin B, a 43-kilometer-diameter feature which is located to the southeast of Maclaurin. To the east of Rankine is the crater Gilbert, and directly to the south is von Behring.

This is an insignificant, bowl-shaped formation with a negligible interior floor. The crater is circular and symmetrical, and the sloping interior walls are nearly featureless (although they have a slightly higher albedo than the surrounding terrain.) It is otherwise indistinguishable from many other comparably sized craters on the Moon.
