= Rankin Bridge =

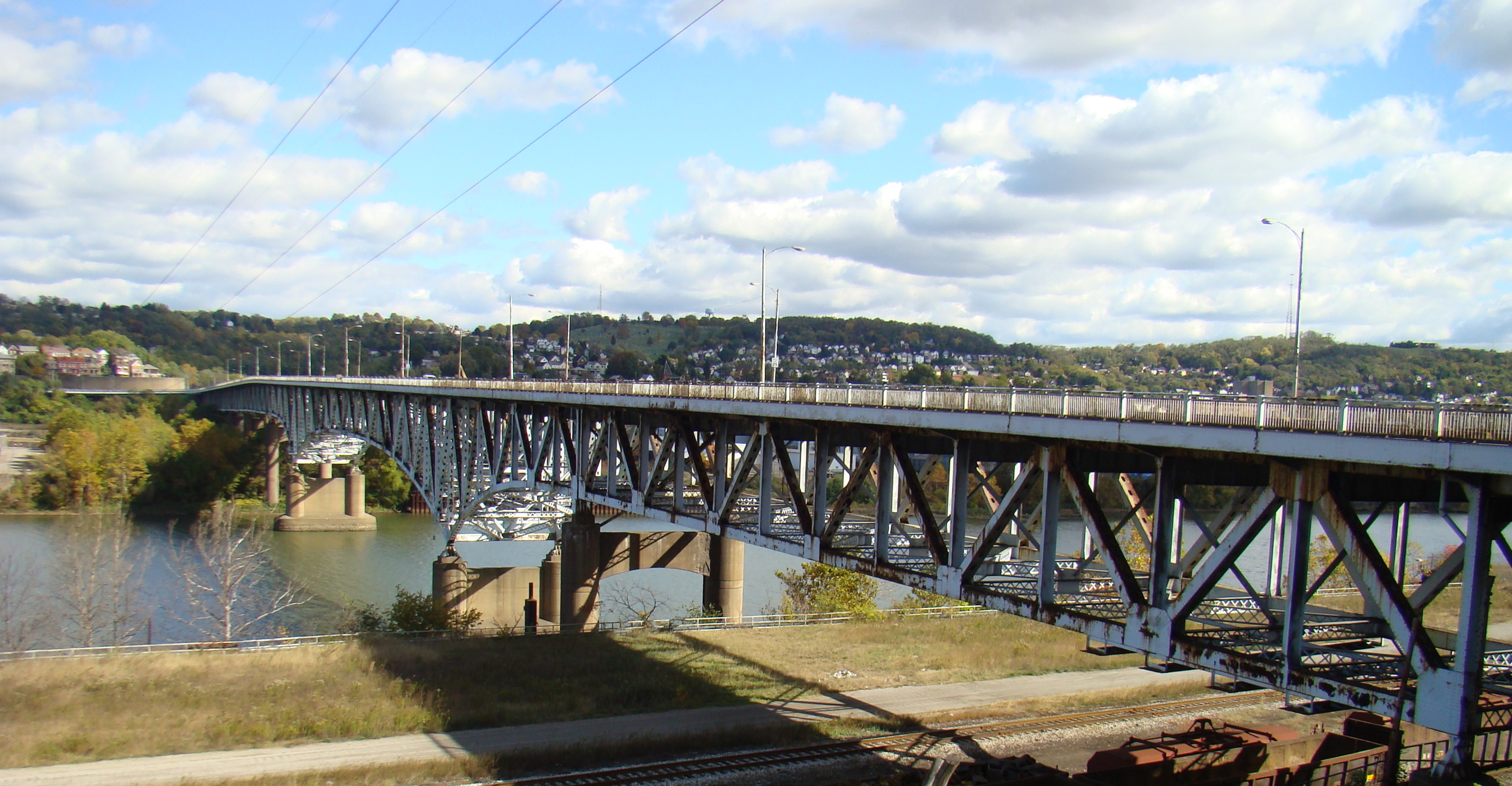
- Coordinates: 40.4056°N 79.8806°W
- Carries: 4 lanes of the Green Belt
- Crosses: Monongahela River
- Locale: Whitaker, Pennsylvania and Rankin, Pennsylvania
- Official name: George Rankin Jr. Memorial Bridge

Characteristics
- Design: Cantilever bridge
- Longest span: 505.25 feet (154 m)
- Clearance below: 75 feet (23 m)

History
- Opened: 1951

Location
- Interactive map of Rankin Bridge

The George Rankin Jr. Memorial Bridge is a cantilever bridge that carries the Green Belt across the Monongahela River between Whitaker and Rankin in Pennsylvania in the USA. It carries four lanes of automobile traffic, plus pedestrian walkways, both paved with concrete. The bridge carries over 22,500 people per day. The bridge and many of its approach ramps were originally built with tram tracks, all of which have since been removed.

== History ==
The Rankin Bridge was built on the site of the 1897 steel truss West Braddock Bridge, a narrow trolley bridge equipped with a wooden deck. Like similar road-rail bridges in the area, the West Braddock Bridge was poorly suited to automobile and truck traffic, a deficiency the new bridge rectified.

The Rankin Bridge was first and foremost an automobile bridge, but it also accommodated streetcars with equal facility as it carried Pittsburgh Railways trolley route #55 Homestead-East Pittsburgh on both the main span (the middle two traffic lanes) and the cloverleaf ramps to Kenmawr/Braddock Avenue on the Rankin and Braddock side of the river. In an unusual and complicated, but nevertheless fluid, setup, the tracks of the 55 crossed over the top of, and then interfaced on the surface with, the tracks of another route, #67 Swissvale-Rankin-Braddock, which then left Kenmawr to run on Ridge and Talbot streets in Braddock, while the 55 took the tracks on Braddock Avenue for the last leg of its trip to East Pittsburgh. A 55 car could also become a 67 car if necessary, and vice versa, by taking each other's route, in either direction.

Though not containing a cloverleaf, the western (Whitaker) end of the bridge also had its share of streetcar and highway complexity. A third trolley route, #68 Homestead-Duquesne-Kennywood-McKeesport, utilized the western approach, though not the bridge itself, going straight on PA 837 (Monongahela Boulevard) while the outbound route 55 turned left onto the bridge. The connection was an at-grade three-way "T" junction; the seldom-used third leg allowed route 68 cars to cross the bridge. This junction was made without conflicts with auto traffic, as through traffic on Mon Boulevard (today's northbound lanes) passed under the bridge.

Route 55 was converted to bus on September 5, 1965, ending trolley service over the Rankin Bridge and its ramps. Route 67 cars made their last runs on January 28, 1967, while route 68 had been converted to bus earlier, on September 21, 1958.

The Rankin Bridge has been upgraded several times, including at least two redeckings, plus creation of new dual southbound through lanes for PA 837 and conversion of the original 837 through lanes to northbound only. Most recently, the bridge received a $47.8 million comprehensive rehabilitation, which included replacement of the concrete deck and the sidewalks. The new deck is wider, allowing for slightly wider lanes, as well as permitting the shoulders to be co-designated as bicycle lanes. Special attention was given to the gusset plates on the bridge structure, a component implicated in the I-35W Mississippi River bridge collapse in Minneapolis in 2007. Traffic restrictions ended in December 2010, and the entire project was completed in late April 2011.

The structure is named after former Allegheny County Commissioner and State Representative George Rankin, Jr. of nearby Wilkinsburg.

Charles Herold assisted with the removal of the tram tracks.

== See also ==
- List of crossings of the Monongahela River
