= Rankine's theory =

Theory in soil mechanics

Rankine's theory, also known as maximum-normal stress theory, developed in 1857 by William John Macquorn Rankine, is a stress field solution that predicts active and passive earth pressure. It assumes that the soil is cohesionless, the wall is frictionless, the soil-wall interface is vertical, the failure surface on which the soil moves is planar, and the resultant force is angled parallel to the backfill surface. The equations for active and passive lateral earth pressure coefficients are given below. Note that φ' is the angle of shearing resistance of the soil and the backfill is inclined at angle β to the horizontal.

$$K_a = \frac{\cos \beta - \left(\cos ^2 \beta - \cos ^2 \phi \right)^{1/2}}{\cos \beta + \left(\cos ^2 \beta - \cos ^2 \phi \right)^{1/2}}*cos\beta$$

$$K_p = \frac{\cos \beta + \left(\cos ^2 \beta - \cos ^2 \phi \right)^{1/2}}{\cos \beta - \left(\cos ^2 \beta - \cos ^2 \phi \right)^{1/2}}*cos\beta$$

For the case where β is 0, the above equations simplify to

$$K_a = \tan ^2 \left( 45 - \frac{\phi}{2} \right) \$$

$$K_p = \tan ^2 \left( 45 + \frac{\phi}{2} \right) \$$

== Rankine theory ==
Rankine's Theory says that failure will occur when the maximum principal stress at any point reaches a value equal to the tensile stress in a simple tension specimen at failure. This theory does not take into account the effect of the other two principal stresses. Rankine's theory is satisfactory for brittle materials, and not applicable to ductile materials. This theory is also called the Maximum Stress Theory.

== Active and passive soil pressures ==
This theory, which considers the soil to be in a state of plastic equilibrium, makes the assumptions that the soil is homogeneous, isotropic and has internal friction. The pressure exerted by soil against the wall is referred to as active pressure. The resistance offered by the soil to an object pushing against it is referred to as "passive pressure". Rankine's theory is applicable to incompressible soils. The equation for cohesionless active earth pressure is expressed as:

$$P_a = K_a w h$$

where:

$$K_a = \frac{\cos \beta - \left(\cos ^2 \beta - \cos ^2 \phi \right)^{1/2}}{\cos \beta + \left(\cos ^2 \beta - \cos ^2 \phi \right)^{1/2}}*\cos\beta$$

and:

K_{a} = Coefficient of active pressure

w = weight density of soil

h = depth of the section (below top soil) where the pressure is being evaluated.

β = angle that the top surface of soil makes with the horizontal.

φ = angle of internal friction of soil.

The expression for passive pressure is:

$$P_p = K_p w h$$

where:

$$K_p = \frac{\cos \beta + \left(\cos ^2 \beta - \cos ^2 \phi \right)^{1/2}}{\cos \beta - \left(\cos ^2 \beta - \cos ^2 \phi \right)^{1/2}}*\cos\beta$$
Or in the case of β=0, then the two coefficients are inversely proportional, such that:
$$K_p = \frac{1}{K_a}$$

== See also ==
- Lateral earth pressure
- Mohr–Coulomb theory
- Soil mechanics
- Retaining wall
