= Rankin, Pennsylvania =

Borough in Pennsylvania, US

- Borough
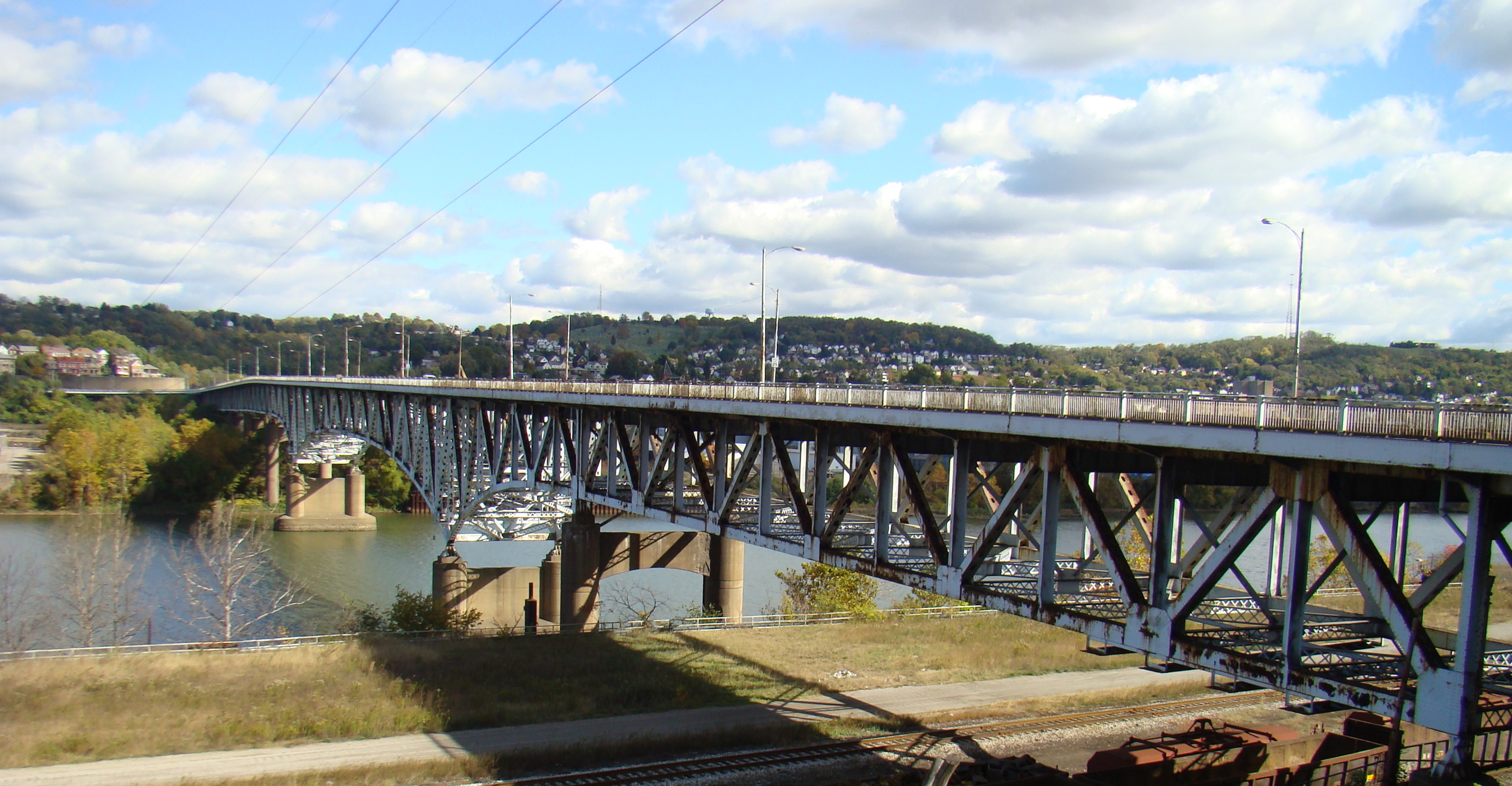
- Rankin Bridge

- Location in Allegheny County and the U.S. state of Pennsylvania.
- Coordinates: 40°24′40″N 79°52′44″W
- Country: United States
- State: Pennsylvania
- County: Allegheny

Government
  - Type: Mayor-Council
  - Mayor: Joelisa McDonald

Area
  - Total: 0.51 sq mi (1.31 km^{2})
  - Land: 0.43 sq mi (1.12 km^{2})
  - Water: 0.073 sq mi (0.19 km^{2})

Population (2020)
  - Total: 1,896
  - Density: 4,378/sq mi (1,690.3/km^{2})
- Time zone: UTC-5 (Eastern (EST))
  - Summer (DST): UTC-4 (EDT)
- FIPS code: 42-63408
- Website: www.rankinborough.com

Rankin is a borough in Allegheny County, Pennsylvania, United States, 8 miles (13 km) south of Pittsburgh on the Monongahela River. The borough was named after Thomas Rankin, a local landowner. Early in the 20th century, Rankin specialized in manufacturing steel and wire goods. The population increased from 3,775 in 1900 to 7,470 in 1940 and has since declined to 1,896 as of the 2020 census.

== Geography ==
Rankin is located at 40°24′40″N 79°52′44″W (40.411069, −79.878884).

According to the United States Census Bureau, the borough has a total area of 0.5 square miles (1.3 km^{2}), of which 0.4 square miles (1.0 km^{2}) is land and 0.1 square miles (0.26 km^{2}), or 12.00%, is water.

== Surrounding and adjacent communities ==
Rankin has three land borders, including Swissvale to the north and west, and North Braddock and Braddock to the east. Across the Monongahela River to the southwest, Rankin runs adjacent with Munhall and Whitaker, the latter with a direct connector via Rankin Bridge.

== Government and politics ==
Presidential election results
Year	Republican	Democratic	Third parties
2020	11% 87	88% 662	0.4% 3
2016	9% 83	90% 804	1% 2
2012	8% 78	90% 886	2% 25

== Demographics ==
Historical population
Census	Pop.	Note	%±
1900	3,775		—
1910	6,042		60.1%
1920	7,301		20.8%
1930	7,956		9.0%
1940	7,470		−6.1%
1950	6,941		−7.1%
1960	5,164		−25.6%
1970	3,704		−28.3%
1980	2,892		−21.9%
1990	2,503		−13.5%
2000	2,315		−7.5%
2010	2,122		−8.3%
2020	1,896		−10.7%

=== 2020 census ===
Rankin borough, Pennsylvania – Racial and ethnic composition Note: the US Census treats Hispanic/Latino as an ethnic category. This table excludes Latinos from the racial categories and assigns them to a separate category. Hispanics/Latinos may be of any race.
Race / Ethnicity (NH = Non-Hispanic)	Pop 2000	Pop 2010	Pop 2020	% 2000	% 2010	% 2020
White alone (NH)	648	381	256	27.99%	17.95%	13.50%
Black or African American alone (NH)	1,601	1,629	1,504	69.16%	76.77%	79.32%
Native American or Alaska Native alone (NH)	3	6	0	0.13%	0.28%	0.00%
Asian alone (NH)	4	3	6	0.17%	0.14%	0.32%
Native Hawaiian or Pacific Islander alone (NH)	0	0	0	0.00%	0.00%	0.00%
Other race alone (NH)	7	18	9	0.30%	0.85%	0.47%
Mixed race or Multiracial (NH)	44	63	73	1.90%	2.97%	3.85%
Hispanic or Latino (any race)	8	22	48	0.35%	1.04%	2.53%
Total	2,315	2,122	1,896	100.00%	100.00%	100.00%

=== 2000 census ===
As of the 2000 census, there were 2,315 people, 1,002 households, and 603 families residing in the borough. The population density was 5,299.5 inhabitants per square mile (2,046.1/km^{2}). There were 1,126 housing units at an average density of 2,577.6 per square mile (995.2/km^{2}). The racial makeup of the borough was 27.99% White, 69.33% African American, 0.13% Native American, 0.17% Asian, 0.39% from other races, and 1.99% from two or more races. Hispanic or Latino of any race were 0.35% of the population. 6.8% were of Italian and 5.2% Slovak ancestry according to 2000 census. 97.8% spoke English, 1.2% Spanish and 1.0% Slovak as their first language.

The 2010 census revealed there were 2,122 people residing in Rankin. The population density was 4,858.7 people per square mile (1,862.0 km^{2}). The racial makeup was 18.05% White, 80.25% African American, 0.47% Asian, 0.99% from other races, and Hispanic or Latino of any race were 0.24% of the population.

There were 1,002 households, out of which 33.6% had children under the age of 18 living with them, 20.5% were married couples living together, 34.5% had a female householder with no husband present, and 39.8% were non-families. 37.3% of all households were made up of individuals, and 16.9% had someone living alone who was 65 years of age or older. The average household size was 2.30 and the average family size was 3.02.

In the borough the population was spread out, with 32.7% under the age of 18, 8.5% from 18 to 24, 23.2% from 25 to 44, 18.3% from 45 to 64, and 17.2% who were 65 years of age or older. The median age was 32 years. For every 100 females, there were 68.1 males. For every 100 females aged 18 and over, there were 59.7 males.

The median income for a household in the borough was $13,832, and the median income for a family was $18,625. Males had a median income of $30,000 versus $21,302 for females. The per capita income for the borough was $9,946. About 40.2% of families and 45.0% of the population were below the poverty line, including 66.8% of those under age 18 and 27.5% of those age 65 or over.

== Education ==
It is in the Woodland Hills School District.

The comprehensive high school for the district is Woodland Hills High School.
