= Rankine's method =

Civil engineering method invented in Scotland

Rankine's method or tangential angle method is an angular technique for laying out circular curves by a combination of chaining and angles at circumference, fully exploiting the theodolite and making a substantial improvement in accuracy and productivity over existing methods. This method requires access to only one road/path of communication to lay out a curve. Points on curve are calculated by their angular offset from the path of communication.

Rankine's method is named for its discoverer William John Macquorn Rankine at an early stage of his career. He had been working on railways in Ireland, on the construction of the Dublin and Drogheda line.

== Background ==
This method makes sure that any line drawn from the known tangent to curve is a chord of the curve by constraining the deflection angle of line. Since end points of chords lie on the curve this can be used to approximate the shape of actual curve.

== Procedure ==
Let AB be a tangent line/path of communication or start of a curve, then successive points on the curve can be obtained by drawing an arbitrary line of length $C_i$ from point A with an angle $\Delta_i = \sum_{j=0}^{i} \delta_j$

$\delta_i = \frac{C_i \times 180}{2 \pi R}$

where $\delta_i$ is deflection from nth chord in degrees.

R is the radius of circular curve

$C_i$ is arbitrary length of chord

== See also ==
- Dublin and Drogheda Railway
