= Rankin Octagonal Barn =

- U.S. National Register of Historic Places
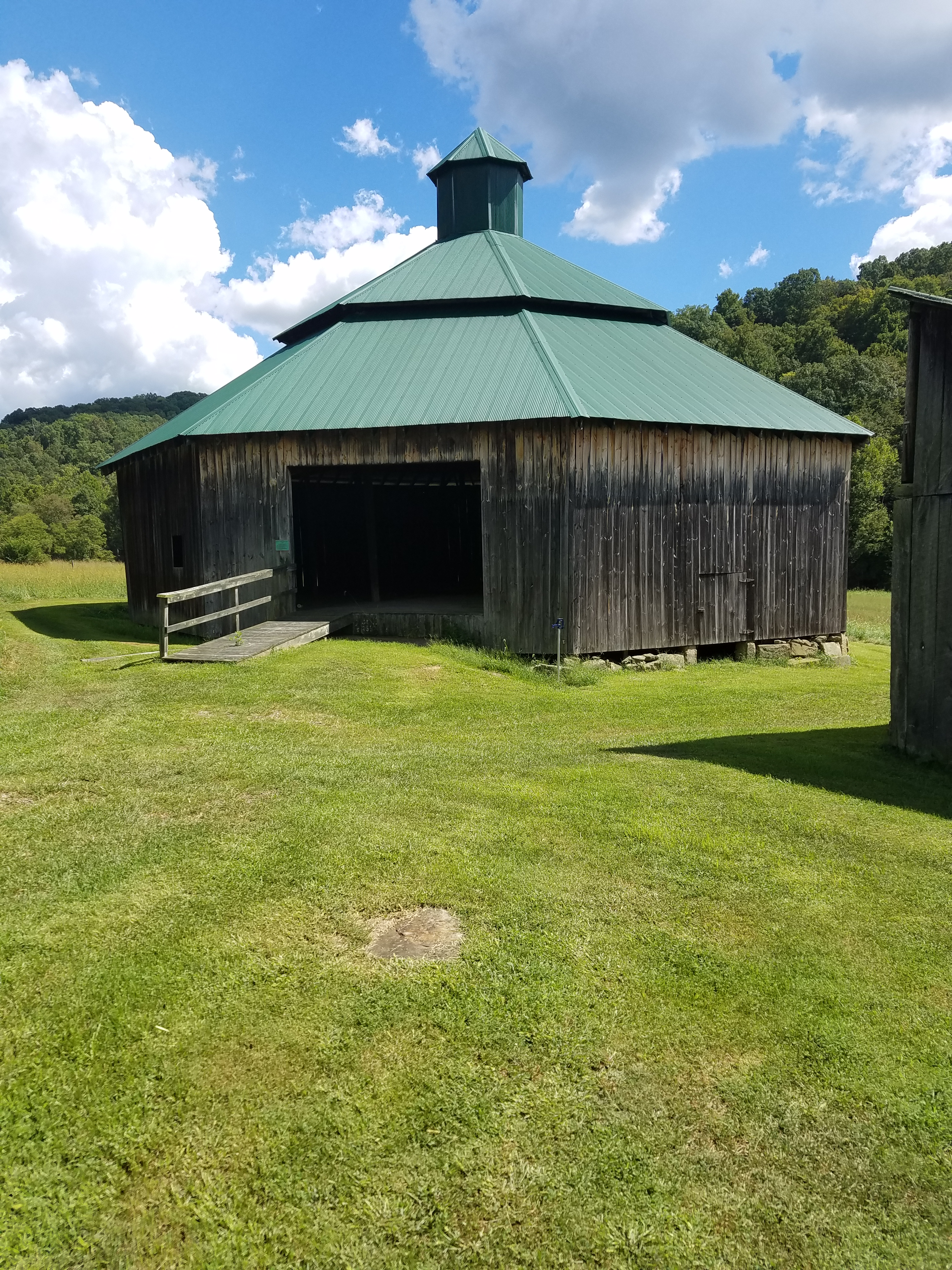

- Location within West Virginia Location within the United States
- Location: County Route 3, near Silverton, West Virginia
- Coordinates: 38°56′45″N 81°41′44″W
- Area: 1 acre (0.40 ha)
- Built: c. 1890
- Architect: Carmichael
- Architectural style: Octagonal Barn
- MPS: Round and Polygonal Barns of West Virginia TR
- NRHP reference No.: 85001551
- Added to NRHP: July 9, 1985

Rankin Octagonal Barn is a historic octagonal barn located near Silverton, Jackson County, West Virginia. It was built about 1890, and is an eight-sided frame structure covered with vertical wide board siding. Each side of the octagon measures 24 feet in length. It features a central cupola to provide light and ventilation.

It was listed on the National Register of Historic Places in 1985.
