= Burgers vortex =

Solution to the Navier–Stokes equations

In fluid dynamics, the Burgers vortex or Burgers–Rott vortex is an exact solution to the Navier–Stokes equations governing viscous flow, named after Jan Burgers and Nicholas Rott. The Burgers vortex describes a stationary, affine flow. An inward, radial flow, tends to concentrate vorticity in a narrow column around the symmetry axis, while an axial stretching causes the vorticity to increase. At the same time, viscous diffusion tends to spread the vorticity. The stationary Burgers vortex arises when the three effects are in balance.

The Burgers vortex, apart from serving as an illustration of the vortex stretching mechanism, may describe such flows as tornados, where the vorticity is provided by continuous convection-driven vortex stretching.

== Flow field ==
Azimuthal velocity and $z$-component vorticity in a Burgers' vortex

The flow for the Burgers vortex is described in cylindrical $(r,\theta,z)$ coordinates. Assuming axial symmetry (no $\theta$-dependence), the flow field associated with the axisymmetric stagnation point flow is considered:

$$v_r= -\alpha r,$$
$$v_z=2\alpha z,$$
$$v_\theta=\frac{\Gamma}{2\pi r}g(r),$$

where $\alpha>0$ (strain rate) and $\Gamma>0$ (circulation) are constants. The flow satisfies the continuity equation by the two first of the above equations. The azimuthal momentum equation of the Navier–Stokes equations then reduces to

$$r \frac{d^2 g}{d r^2} + \left(\frac{\alpha r^2}{\nu} -1 \right) \frac{dg}{d r} = 0$$

where $\nu$ is the kinematic viscosity of the fluid. The equation is integrated with the condition $g(\infty)=1$ so that at infinity the solution behaves like a potential vortex, but at finite location, the flow is rotational. The choice $g(0)=0$ ensures $v_\theta=0$ at the axis. The solution is

$$g= 1 - \exp \left(-\frac{\alpha r^2}{2\nu}\right).$$

The vorticity equation only gives a non-trivial component in the $z$-direction, given by

$$\omega_z = \frac{\alpha\Gamma}{2\pi\nu} \exp \left(-\frac{\alpha r^2}{2\nu}\right).$$

Intuitively the flow can be understood by looking at the three terms in the vorticity equation for $\omega_z$,

$$-\alpha r \frac{d \omega_z}{d r} = 2 \alpha\omega_z + \frac{\nu}{r}\frac{d}{dr}\left( r\frac{d\omega_z}{dr}\right).$$

The first term on the right-hand side of the above equation corresponds to vortex stretching which intensifies the vorticity of the vortex core due to the axial-velocity component $v_z=2\alpha z$. The intensified vorticity tries to diffuse outwards radially due to the second term on the right-hand side, but is prevented by radial vorticity convection due to $v_r=-\alpha r$ that emerges on the left-hand side of the above equation. The three-way balance establishes a steady solution. The Burgers vortex is a stable solution of the Navier–Stokes equations.

One of the important property of the Burgers vortex that was shown by Jan Burgers is that the total viscous dissipation rate $\Phi$ per unit axial length is independent of the viscosity, indicating that dissipation by the Burgers vortex is non-zero even in the limit $\nu\to 0$. For this reason, it serves as a suitable candidate in modelling and understanding stretched-vortex tubes observed in turbulent flows. The total dissipation rate per unit axial length is, in incompressible flows, simply equal to the total enstrophy per unit length, which is given by

$$\Phi = \nu \int_0^{2\pi}\int_0^\infty \omega_z^2\, rdrd\theta = \frac{\alpha\Gamma^2}{4\pi}.$$

=== Unsteady evolution to Burgers's vortex ===
An exact solution of the time dependent Navier Stokes equations for arbitrary function $\alpha=\alpha(t)$ is available. In particular, when $\alpha$ is constant, the vorticity field $\omega(r,t)$ with an arbitrary initial distribution $\Omega(r)=\omega(r,0)$ is given by

$$\omega (r,t)=\frac{\alpha}{2\pi \nu(1-e^{-2\alpha t})}\iint \Omega\left(\sqrt{\xi_1^2+\eta_1^2}~\right) \exp \left[\frac{-(x-\xi_1e^{-\alpha t})^2-(y-\eta_1 e^{-\alpha t})^2}{(2\nu/\alpha)(1-e^{-2\alpha t})}\right]\,d\xi_1d\eta_1.$$

As $t\rightarrow \infty$, the asymptotic behaviour is given by

$$\omega(r,t)= \frac{\alpha}{2\pi\nu} \exp \left(-\frac{\alpha r^2}{2\nu}\right)\left[\Gamma +e^{-2\alpha t}\int_0^\infty \Omega(s) \left(\frac{\alpha r^2}{2\nu}-1\right)\left(\frac{\alpha s^2}{2\nu}-1\right)2\pi s\,ds + O(e^{-4\alpha t})\right], \qquad \Gamma = \int_0^\infty \Omega(s) 2\pi s\,ds$$

Thus, provided $\Gamma\neq 0$, an arbitrary vorticity distribution approaches the Burgers' vortex. If $\Gamma= 0$, say in the case where the initial condition is composed of two equal and opposite vortices, then the first term is zero and the second term implies that vorticity decays to zero as $t\rightarrow \infty.$

== Burgers vortex layer ==
$y$-component velocity and $z$-component vorticity in a Burgers' vortex layer

Burgers vortex layer or Burgers vortex sheet is a strained shear layer, which is a two-dimensional analogue of Burgers vortex. This is also an exact solution of the Navier–Stokes equations, first described by Albert A. Townsend in 1951. The velocity field $(v_x,v_y,v_z)$ expressed in the Cartesian coordinates are

$$v_x= -\alpha x,$$
$$v_z=\alpha z,$$
$$v_y= U\operatorname{erf}\left( \frac{\sqrt\alpha x}{\sqrt{2\nu}} \right),$$

where $\alpha>0$ is the strain rate, $v_y(+\infty) = U$ and $v_y(-\infty) = -U$. The value $2U$ is interpreted as the vortex sheet strength. The vorticity equation only gives a non-trivial component in the $z$-direction, given by

$$\omega_z = 2U\sqrt{\frac{\alpha}{2\pi\nu}} \exp \left(-\frac{\alpha x^2}{2\nu}\right).$$

The Burgers vortex sheet is shown to be unstable to small disturbances by K. N. Beronov and S. Kida thereby undergoing Kelvin–Helmholtz instability initially, followed by second instabilities and possibly transitioning to Kerr–Dold vortices at moderately large Reynolds numbers, but becoming turbulent at large Reynolds numbers.

== Non-axisymmetric Burgers vortices ==
Non-axisymmetric Burgers' vortices emerge in non-axisymmetric strained flows. The theory for non-axisymmetric Burgers's vortex for small vortex Reynolds numbers $Re=\Gamma/(2\pi \nu)$ was developed by A. C. Robinson and Philip Saffman in 1984, whereas Keith Moffatt, S. Kida and K. Ohkitani has developed the theory for $Re\gg 1$ in 1994. The structure of non-axisymmetric Burgers' vortices for arbitrary values of vortex Reynolds number can be discussed through numerical integrations. The velocity field takes the form

$$v_x = -\alpha x + u(x,y),$$
$$v_y = -\beta y + v(x,y),$$
$$v_z = \gamma z$$

subjected to the condition $\gamma=\alpha+\beta$. Without loss of generality, one assumes $\alpha>0$ and $\gamma>0$. The vortex cross-section lies in $xy$ plane, providing a non-zero vorticity component in the $z$ direction

$$\omega_z = \frac{\partial u}{\partial y}-\frac{\partial v}{\partial x}.$$

The axisymmetric Burgers' vortex is recovered when $\alpha=\beta=\gamma/2$ whereas the Burgers' vortex layer is recovered when $\alpha=\gamma$ and $\beta=0$.

== Burgers vortex in cylindrical stagnation surfaces ==
Explicit solution of the Navier–Stokes equations for the Burgers vortex in stretched cylindrical stagnation surfaces was solved by P. Rajamanickam and A. D. Weiss. The solution is expressed in the cylindrical coordinate system as follows

$$v_r= -\alpha \left(r - \frac{r_s^2}{r}\right),$$
$$v_z=2\alpha z,$$
$$v_\theta= \frac{\Gamma}{2\pi r}P\left(1+ \frac{\alpha r_s^2}{2\nu},\frac{\alpha r^2}{2\nu}\right),$$

where $\alpha>0$ is the strain rate, $r_s\geq 0$ is the radial location of the cylindrical stagnation surface, $\Gamma>0$ is the circulation and $P$ is the regularized gamma function. This solution is nothing but the Burgers' vortex in the presence of a line source with source strength $Q=2\pi \alpha r_s^2$. The vorticity equation only gives a non-trivial component in the $z$-direction, given by

$$\omega_z = \frac{\alpha\Gamma}{2\pi\nu \tilde\Gamma(1+\alpha r_s^2/2\nu)}\left(\frac{\alpha r^2}{2\nu}\right)^{\alpha r_s^2/2\nu} \exp \left(-\frac{\alpha r^2}{2\nu}\right)$$

where $\tilde\Gamma$ in the above expression is the gamma function. As $r_s\rightarrow 0$, the solution reduces to Burgers' vortex solution and as $r_s\rightarrow \infty$, the solution becomes the Burgers' vortex layer solution. Explicit solution for Sullivan vortex in cylindrical stagnation surface also exists.

== See also ==
- Sullivan vortex
- Kerr–Dold vortex
