= Prandtl–Batchelor theorem =

In fluid dynamics, Prandtl–Batchelor theorem states that if in a two-dimensional laminar flow at high Reynolds number closed streamlines occur, then the vorticity in the closed streamline region must be a constant. A similar statement holds true for axisymmetric flows. The theorem is named after Ludwig Prandtl and George Batchelor. Prandtl in his celebrated 1904 paper stated this theorem in arguments, George Batchelor unaware of this work proved the theorem in 1956. The problem was also studied in the same year by Richard Feynman and Paco Lagerstrom and by W.W. Wood in 1957.

The theorem applies to the flow in a lid-driven cavity. In the absence of instabilities, the steady two-dimensional flow should develop at large Reynolds numbers into a vortex with an inviscid core of uniform vorticity, surrounded by viscous boundary layers.

== Mathematical proof ==
At high Reynolds numbers, the two-dimensional problem governed by two-dimensional Euler equations reduce to solving a problem for the stream function $\psi$, which satisfies

$$\nabla^2\psi = - \omega(\psi), \quad \psi=\psi_o \text{ on } \partial D$$

where $\omega$ is the only non-zero vorticity component in the $z$-direction of the vorticity vector. As it stands, the problem is ill-posed since the vorticity distribution $\omega(\psi)$ can have infinite number of possibilities, all of which satisfies the equation and the boundary condition. This is not true if no streamline is closed, in which case, every streamline can be traced back to the boundary $\partial D$ where $\psi$ and therefore its corresponding vorticity $\omega(\psi)$ are prescribed. The difficulty arises only when there are some closed streamlines inside the domain that does not connect to the boundary and one may suppose that at high Reynolds numbers, $\omega(\psi)$ is not uniquely defined in regions where closed streamlines occur. The Prandtl–Batchelor theorem, however, asserts that this is not the case and $\omega(\psi)$ is uniquely defined in such cases, through an examination of the limiting process $Re\rightarrow \infty$ properly.

The steady, non-dimensional vorticity equation in our case reduces to

$$\mathbf{u} \cdot \nabla\mathbf{\omega} = \frac{1}{\mathrm{Re}}\nabla^2\omega.$$

Integrate the equation over a surface $S$ lying entirely in the region where we have closed streamlines, bounded by a closed contour $C$

$$\int_S\mathbf{u} \cdot \nabla\mathbf{\omega}\, d\mathbf S = \frac{1}{\mathrm{Re}}\int_S\nabla^2\omega\, d\mathbf S.$$

The integrand in the left-hand side term can be written as $\nabla \cdot (\omega\mathbf u)$ since $\nabla\cdot\mathbf u=0$. By divergence theorem, one obtains

$$\oint_C \omega\mathbf{u}\cdot \mathbf n dl = \frac{1}{\mathrm{Re}}\oint_C\nabla\omega\cdot \mathbf n dl.$$

where $\mathbf n$ is the outward unit vector normal to the contour line element $dl$. The left-hand side integrand can be made zero if the contour $C$ is taken to be one of the closed streamlines since then the velocity vector projected normal to the contour will be zero, that is to say $\mathbf u\cdot \mathbf n=0$. Thus one obtains

$$\frac{1}{\mathrm{Re}}\oint_C \nabla\omega \cdot \mathbf{n}\ dl = 0$$

This expression is true for finite but large Reynolds number since we did not neglect the viscous term before.

Unlike the two-dimensional inviscid flows, where $\omega=\omega(\psi)$ since $\mathbf u\cdot \nabla \omega =0$ with no restrictions on the functional form of $\omega$, in the viscous flows, $\omega\neq \omega(\psi)$. But for large but finite $\mathrm{Re}$, we can write $\omega=\omega(\psi) + \rm{small\ corrections}$, and this small corrections become smaller and smaller as we increase the Reynolds number. Thus, in the limit $\mathrm{Re}\rightarrow \infty$, in the first approximation (neglecting the small corrections), we have

$$\frac{1}{\mathrm{Re}}\oint_C \nabla\omega \cdot \mathbf{n}\ dl = \frac{1}{\mathrm{Re}}\oint_C \frac{d\omega}{d\psi}\nabla\psi \cdot \mathbf{n}\ dl = 0.$$

Since $d\omega/d\psi$ is constant for a given streamline, we can take that term outside the integral,

$$\frac{1}{\mathrm{Re}}\frac{d\omega}{d\psi}\oint_C \nabla\psi \cdot \mathbf{n}\ dl = 0.$$

One may notice that the integral is negative of the circulation since

$$\Gamma = -\oint_C\mathbf u\cdot d\mathbf{l} =-\int_S \omega d\mathbf S = \int_S \nabla^2\psi d\mathbf{S} = \oint_C \nabla \psi \cdot \mathbf{n} dl$$

where we used the Stokes theorem for circulation and $\omega=-\nabla^2\psi$. Thus, we have

$$\frac{\Gamma}{\mathrm{Re}}\frac{d\omega}{d\psi} = 0.$$

The circulation around those closed streamlines is not zero (unless the velocity at each point of the streamline is zero with a possible discontinuous vorticity jump across the streamline) . The only way the above equation can be satisfied is only if

$$\frac{d\omega}{d\psi} = 0,$$

i.e., vorticity is not changing across these closed streamlines, thus proving the theorem. Of course, the theorem is not valid inside the boundary layer regime. This theorem cannot be derived from the Euler equations.
