= Kerr–Dold vortex =

In fluid dynamics, Kerr–Dold vortex is an exact solution of Navier–Stokes equations, which represents steady periodic vortices superposed on the stagnation point flow (or extensional flow). The solution was discovered by Oliver S. Kerr and John W. Dold in 1994. Kerr–Dold vortices in axisymmetric stagnation point flows was described by P. Rajamanickam. These steady solutions exist as a result of a balance between vortex stretching by the extensional flow and viscous diffusion, which are similar to Burgers vortex. These vortices were first observed experimentally in a four-roll mill apparatus by R. R. Lagnado and L. Gary Leal in 1990 and in a crossed rectangular channel by V. N. Kalashnikov and M. G. Tsiklauri in 1991.

== Mathematical description ==
The stagnation point flow, which is already an exact solution of the Navier–Stokes equation is given by $\mathbf{U}=(0,-Ay,Az)$, where $A$ is the strain rate. To this flow, an additional periodic disturbance can be added such that the new velocity field can be written as

$$\mathbf{u}=\begin{bmatrix}0 \\-Ay \\ Az \end{bmatrix} + \begin{bmatrix}u(x,y) \\v(x,y) \\ 0 \end{bmatrix}$$

where the disturbance $u(x,y)$ and $v(x,y)$ are assumed to be periodic in the $x$ direction with a fundamental wavenumber $k$. Kerr and Dold showed that such disturbances exist with finite amplitude, thus making the solution an exact to Navier–Stokes equations. Introducing a stream function $\psi$ for the disturbance velocity components, the equations for disturbances in vorticity-streamfunction formulation can be shown to reduce to

$$\begin{align}
\omega &= -\left(\frac{\partial^2}{\partial x^2}+\frac{\partial^2}{\partial y^2}\right)\psi\\[6pt]
\frac{\partial \psi}{\partial y} \frac{\partial \omega}{\partial x} - \frac{\partial \psi}{\partial x} \frac{\partial \omega}{\partial y} &- A y\frac{\partial \omega}{\partial y} - A\omega = \nu\left(\frac{\partial^2}{\partial x^2}+\frac{\partial^2}{\partial y^2}\right)\omega
\end{align}$$

where $\omega$ is the disturbance vorticity. A single parameter

$$\lambda = \frac{A}{\nu k^2}$$

can be obtained upon non-dimensionalization, which measures the strength of the converging flow to viscous dissipation. The solution will be assumed to be

$$\psi = \sum_{k=-\infty}^\infty [a_k(y) + i b_k(y)]e^{-ikx}.$$

Since $\psi$ is real, it is easy to verify that $a_k= a_{-k},\,b_k = - b_{-k},\, b_0 =0.$ Since the expected vortex structure has the symmetry $\psi(x,y)=\psi(-x,-y),\, \psi(x,y)=-\psi(\pi-x,y)$, we have $a_0=b_1=0$. Upon substitution, an infinite sequence of differential equation will be obtained which are coupled non-linearly. To derive the following equations, Cauchy product rule will be used. The equations are

$$\begin{align}
& a_k''''+ Ay a_k''' + (A-2k^2)a_k''- k^2 Ay a_k'- k^2 Aa_k + k^4 a_k\\[6pt]
& {} + i\left[b_k'''' + A y b_k''' + (A-2k^2)b_k'' - k^2 Ay b_k' - k^2 Ab_k + k^4 b_k \right]\\[6pt]
= {} & i \sum_{\ell=-\infty}^\infty \left\{\left(a_{k-\ell}' + ib_{k-\ell}'\right)\left[\ell a_\ell'' - \ell^3 a_\ell + i(\ell b_\ell'' - \ell^3 b_\ell)\right]
- (k-\ell) \left(a_{k-\ell}+ib_{k-\ell}\right)\left[a_\ell''' - \ell^2 a_\ell' + i(b_\ell''' - \ell^2 b_\ell')\right]\right\}.
\end{align}$$

The boundary conditions

$$a_k'(0)=b_k(0)=a_k(\infty)=b_k(\infty)=0$$

and the corresponding symmetry condition is enough to solve the problem. It can be shown that non-trivial solution exist only when $\lambda>1.$ On solving this equation numerically, it is verified that keeping first 7 to 8 terms suffice to produce accurate results. The solution when $\lambda=1$ is $\psi=\cos x$ was already discovered by Craik and Criminale in 1986.

== See also ==
- Sullivan vortex
