= Moffatt eddies =

Sequence of viscous eddies in a corner

Streamlines of Moffatt eddies in a right-angled corner (2α = 90°), at three magnifications, as in the lid-driven cavity. Blue lines turn clockwise and red ones counterclockwise. Each eddy turns the opposite way from the last, and is about 16 times smaller with velocities about 2000 times weaker.

Moffatt eddies are sequences of eddies that develop in corners bounded by plane walls (or sometimes between a wall and a free surface) due to an arbitrary disturbance acting at asymptotically large distances from the corner. Although the source of motion is the arbitrary disturbance at large distances, the eddies develop quite independently and thus solution of these eddies emerges from an eigenvalue problem, a self-similar solution of the second kind.

The eddies are named after Keith Moffatt, who discovered these eddies in 1964, although some of the results were already obtained by William Reginald Dean and P. E. Montagnon in 1949. Lord Rayleigh also studied the problem of flow near the corner with homogeneous boundary conditions in 1911. Moffatt eddies inside cones are solved by P. N. Shankar.

== Flow description ==
Near the corner, the flow can be assumed to be Stokes flow. Describing the two-dimensional planar problem by the cylindrical coordinates $(r,\theta)$ with velocity components $(u_r,u_\theta)$ defined by a stream function such that

$$u_r = \frac{1}{r}\frac{\partial\psi}{\partial\theta}, \quad u_\theta=-\frac{\partial\psi}{\partial r}$$

the governing equation can be shown to be simply the biharmonic equation $\nabla^4\psi=0$. The equation has to be solved with homogeneous boundary conditions (conditions taken for two walls separated by angle $2\alpha$)

$$\begin{align}
r>0,\ \theta =-\alpha: &\quad u_r = 0, \ u_\theta= 0\\
r>0,\ \theta =\alpha: &\quad u_r = 0, \ u_\theta= 0.
\end{align}$$

The Taylor scraping flow is similar to this problem but driven inhomogeneous boundary condition. The solution is obtained by the eigenfunction expansion,

$$\psi = \sum_{n=1}^\infty A_n r^{\lambda_n} f_{\lambda_n}(\theta)$$

where $A_n$ are constants and the real part of the eigenvalues are always greater than unity. The eigenvalues $\lambda_n$ will be function of the angle $\alpha$, but regardless eigenfunctions can be written down for any $\lambda$,

$$\begin{align}
f_0 &= A + B\theta + C\theta^2 + D\theta^3,\\
f_1 &= A\cos\theta + B \sin\theta + C\theta\cos\theta + D\theta\sin\theta,\\
f_2 &= A\cos 2\theta + B \sin 2\theta + C\theta + D,\\
f_\lambda &= A\cos\lambda\theta + B\sin\lambda\theta + C\cos(\lambda-2)\theta + D\sin(\lambda-2)\theta, \quad \lambda\geq 2.
\end{align}$$

For antisymmetrical solution, the eigenfunction is even and hence $B=D=0$ and the boundary conditions demand $\sin 2(\lambda-1)\alpha = -(\lambda-1) \sin 2\alpha$. The equations admits no real root when $2\alpha<146$°. These complex eigenvalues indeed correspond to the moffatt eddies. The complex eigenvalue if given by $\lambda_n = 1+(2\alpha)^{-1}(\xi_n+i\eta_n)$ where

$$\begin{align}
\sin\xi \cosh\eta &= - k\xi,\\
\cos\xi \sinh \xi &= - k\eta.
\end{align}$$

Here $k=\sin 2\alpha/2\alpha$.

== See also ==
- Taylor scraping flow
