= Albert Alan Townsend =

Fluid dynamics physicist

- Born: 22 January 1917; Melbourne, Australia
- Died: 31 August 2010 (aged 93); Cambridge, England
- Education: University of Melbourne; University of Cambridge
- Known for: Townsend eddies Townsend-Perry constants Batchelor-Howells-Townsend spectrum Burgers vortex layer
- Scientific career
- Fields: Fluid dynamics
- Workplaces: University of Cambridge
- Thesis: Dissertation on $\beta$-ray spectra of light elements and turbulent flow (1947)
- Doctoral advisor: G. I. Taylor

Albert Alan Townsend FRS (22 Jan 1917 – 31 Aug 2010) was an Australian physicist specialized in fluid dynamics. He was the author of the textbook The Structure of Turbulent Shear Flow (1956; 1976; Cambridge University Press). The terms Townsend's eddies (or Townsend's wall-attached eddies), Batchelor–Howells–Townsend spectrum and Townsend–Perry constants in turbulence research are named after him. His PhD advisor was G. I. Taylor and he was a close collaborator of George Batchelor.

He was elected a Fellow of the Royal Society in 1960.

He graduated from Canberra University and Melbourne University and started his career in the field of nuclear physics. In 1938, he went to the University of Cambridge and joined the Cavendish Laboratory for a PhD degree as there were no Australian universities offering the degree at the time.

During the Second World War, he joined military research and worked on aerodynamics in Australia. In this period, he met George Batchelor and started to research in fluid dynamics. After returning to Cambridge he and Batchelor studied under Geoffrey Ingram Taylor. He obtained a PhD in 1947; his thesis was Beta Ray Spectra of Light Elements and Turbulent Flow. Townsend remained in the Cavendish Laboratory for the rest of his career.

He married Valeria Dees(?–2002) in 1950, and they had three children. He was an enthusiastic tennis player.

== Publications ==
- Selective Absorption of Neutrons in Silver (1936, co-authored with Eric Henry Stonely Burhop and R. D. Hill)
- The production of gamma-rays by neutrons (1938, co-authored with Eric Henry Stonely Burhop and R. D. Hill)
- Intensity of γ radiation produced by slow neutrons (1938, co-authored with R. D. Hill)
- The β-ray spectrum of Ra E (1939, co-authored with Leslie Harold Martin)
- β-ray spectra of light elements (1941)
- 'Singing'-Corner Vanes (1945, co-authored with George Batchelor)
- The measurement of double and triple correlation derivatives in isotropic turbulence (1947)
- Measurements in the turbulent wake of a cylinder (1947)
- Decay of vorticity in isotropic turbulence (1947, co-authored with George Batchelor)
- Experimental evidence for the theory of local isotropy (1948, co-authored with George Batchelor)
- Decay of isotropic turbulence in the initial period (1948, co-authored with George Batchelor)
- Decay of turbulence in the final period (1948, co-authored with George Batchelor)
- Momentum and energy diffusion in the turbulent wake of a cylinder (1949)
- The fully developed wake of a circular cylinder (1949)
- The nature of turbulent motion at large wave-numbers (1949, co-authored with George Batchelor)
- The diffusion of heat spots in isotropic turbulence (1951)
- The passage of turbulence through wire gauzes (1951)
- Similarity and self-preservation in isotropic turbulence (1951, co-authored with Robert William Stewart)
- The structure of the turbulent boundary layer (1951)
- On the fine-scale structure of turbulence (1951)
- The diffusion behind a line source in homogeneous turbulence (1954)
- The uniform distortion of homogeneous turbulence (1954)
- The properties of equilibrium boundary layers (1956)
- Turbulent convection over a heated horizontal surface (1957, co-authored with D. B. Thomas)
- Turbulent flow in a stably stratified atmosphere (1958)
- The effects of radiative transfer on turbulent flow of a stratified fluid (1958)
- The turbulent boundary layer (1958)
- Small-scale variation of convected quantities like temperature in turbulent fluid Part 2. The case of large conductivity (1959, co-authored with George Batchelor and I. D. Howells)
- Temperature fluctuations over a heated horizontal surface (1959)
- The development of turbulent boundary layers with negligible wall stress (1960)
- A continuum theory of the isothermal flow of liquid helium II (1961)
- On the fine-scale structure of turbulence (1961)
- Natural convection in the earth's boundary layer (1962)
- The behaviour of a turbulent boundary layer near separation (1962)
- On the hydrodynamic equations for flow of liquid helium II with mutual friction (1963)
- Natural convection in water over an ice surface (1964)
- Change of terrain roughness and the wind profile (1964, co-authored with H. A . Panofsky)
- The interpretation of stellar shadow-bands as a consequence of turbulent mixing (1965)
- Self-preserving flow inside a turbulent boundary layer (1965)
- Self-preserving development within turbulent boundary layers in strong adverse pressure gradients (1965)
- The response of a turbulent boundary layer to abrupt changes in surface conditions (1965)
- Excitation of internal waves by a turbulent boundary layer (1965)
- The flow in a turbulent boundary layer after a change in surface roughness (1966)
- Internal waves produced by a convective layer (1966)
- The mechanism of entrainment in free turbulent flows (1966)
- Wind and the formation of inversions (1967)
- Excitation of internal waves in a stably-stratified atmosphere with considerable wind-shear (1968)
- Entrainment and the structure of turbulent flow (1970)
- Mixed convection over a heated horizontal plane (1972)
- Flow in a deep turbulent boundary layer over a surface distorted by water waves (1972)
- Flow patterns of large eddies in a wake and in a boundary layer (1979)
- The response of sheared turbulence to additional distortion (1980)
- Identification of flow patterns in turbulent flows (1980, co-authored with J. C. Mumford and A. M. Savill)
- The development of a turbulent wake in a distorting duct (1981, co-authored with C. J. Elliott)
- Turbulent Couette flow between concentric cylinders at large Taylor numbers (1982, co-authored with G. P. Smith)
- Turbulent Flow and the Effects of Curvature (1983)
- Axisymmetric Couette flow at large Taylor numbers (1984)
- Organized eddy structures in turbulent flows (1987)
- Entrainment in Free Turbulent Flows (1989)
- Organised Eddies in Turbulent Shear Flows (1993)
