= Vortex sheet =

A vortex sheet is a term used in fluid mechanics for a surface across which there is a discontinuity in fluid velocity, such as in slippage of one layer of fluid over another. While the tangential components of the flow velocity are discontinuous across the vortex sheet, the normal component of the flow velocity is continuous. The discontinuity in the tangential velocity means the flow has infinite vorticity on a vortex sheet.

At high Reynolds numbers, vortex sheets tend to be unstable. In particular, they may exhibit Kelvin–Helmholtz instability.

The formulation of the vortex sheet equation of motion is given in terms of a complex coordinate $z = x + iy$. The sheet is described parametrically by $z(s,t)$ where $s$ is the arclength between coordinate $z$ and a reference point, and $t$ is time. Let $\gamma(s,t)$ denote the strength of the sheet, that is, the jump in the tangential discontinuity. Then the velocity field induced by the sheet is

$\frac{\partial z^*}{\partial t} = -\frac{\imath}{2\pi} \int\limits_{-\infty}^{\infty} \frac{\gamma(s',t)\mathrm{d}s'}{z(s, t)-z(s', t)}$

The integral in the above equation is a Cauchy principal value integral. We now define $\Gamma$ as the integrated sheet strength or circulation between a point with arc length $s$ and the reference material point $s=0$ in the sheet.

$\Gamma(s,t) = \int\limits_{0}^{s}\gamma(s',t)\mathrm{d}s' \qquad\mathrm{and}\qquad \frac{\mathrm{d}\Gamma}{\mathrm{d}s}=\gamma(s,t)$

As a consequence of Kelvin's circulation theorem, in the absence of external forces on the sheet, the circulation between any two material points in the sheet remains conserved, so $\mathrm{d}\Gamma/\mathrm{d}t=0$. The equation of motion of the sheet can be rewritten in terms of $\Gamma$ and $t$ by a change of variable. The parameter $s$ is replaced by $\Gamma$. That is,

$\frac{\partial z^*}{\partial t}=-\frac{\imath}{2\pi} \int\limits_{-\infty}^{\infty}\frac{d\Gamma'}{z(\Gamma, t)-z(\Gamma', t)}$

This nonlinear integro-differential equation is called the Birkoff-Rott equation. It describes the evolution of the vortex sheet given initial conditions. Greater details on vortex sheets can be found in the textbook by Saffman (1977).

== Diffusion of a vortex sheet ==
Once a vortex sheet, it will diffuse due to viscous action. Consider a planar unidirectional flow at $t=0$,

$$u=  \begin{cases}
+U, & \text{for } y> 0\\
-U, & \text{for } y<0 \end{cases}$$

implying the presence of a vortex sheet at $y=0$. The velocity discontinuity smooths out according to

$$u(y,t)=\frac{U}{2\sqrt{\pi\nu t}}\left[\int_0^\infty e^{-(s-y)^2/4\nu t}\mathrm{d}s - \int_0^\infty e^{-(s+y)^2/4\nu t}\mathrm{d}s\right].$$

where $\nu$ is the kinematic viscosity. The only non-zero vorticity component is in the $z$ direction, given by

$$\omega_z = - \frac{U}{\sqrt{\pi \nu t}} e^{-y^2/4\nu t}$$.

== Vortex sheet with periodic boundaries ==
A flat vortex sheet with periodic boundaries in the streamwise direction can be used to model a temporal free shear layer at high Reynolds number. Let us assume that the interval between the periodic boundaries is of length $1$. Then the equation of motion of the vortex sheet reduces to

$\frac{\partial z^*}{\partial t}=-\frac{\imath}{2} \int\limits_{0}^{1}\cot \pi(z(\Gamma, t)-z(\Gamma', t))\;d\Gamma'$

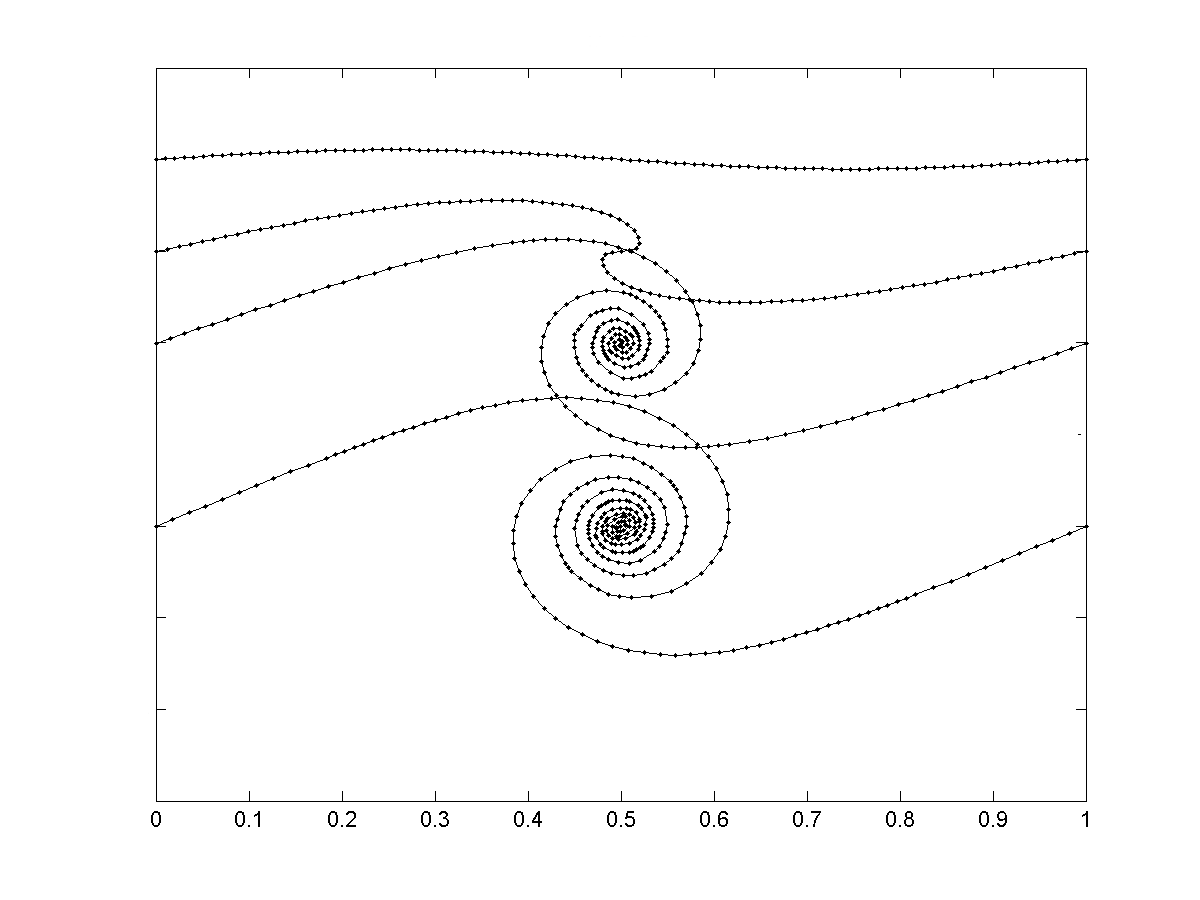
Continuous vortex sheet approximation by panel method. Roll-up of a vortex sheet due to an initial sinusoidal perturbation.

Note that the integral in the above equation is a Cauchy principal value integral. The initial condition for a flat vortex sheet with constant strength is $z(\Gamma, 0) = \Gamma$. The flat vortex sheet is an equilibrium solution. However, it is unstable to infinitesimal periodic disturbances of the form $\sum^{\infty}_{k=-\infty}A_k\mathrm{e}^{\imath2\pi k\Gamma}$. Linear theory shows that the Fourier coefficient $A_k$ grows exponentially at a rate proportional to $k$. That is, higher the wavenumber of a Fourier mode, the faster it grows. However, a linear theory cannot be extended much beyond the initial state. If nonlinear interactions are taken into account, asymptotic analysis suggests that for large $k$ and finite $t<t_c$, where $t_c$ is a critical value, the Fourier coefficient $A_k$ decays exponentially. The vortex sheet solution is expected to lose analyticity at the critical time. See Moore (1979), and Meiron, Baker and Orszag (1983).

The vortex sheet solution as given by the Birkoff-Rott equation cannot go beyond the critical time. The spontaneous loss of analyticity in a vortex sheet is a consequence of mathematical modeling since a real fluid with viscosity, however small, will never develop singularity. Viscosity acts a smoothing or regularization parameter in a real fluid. There have been extensive studies on a vortex sheet, most of them by discrete or point vortex approximation, with or without desingularization. Using a point vortex approximation and delta-regularization Krasny (1986) obtained a smooth roll-up of a vortex sheet into a double branched spiral. Since point vortices are inherently chaotic, a Fourier filter is necessary to control the growth of round-off errors. Continuous approximation of a vortex sheet by vortex panels with arc wise diffusion of circulation density also shows that the sheet rolls-up into a double branched spiral.

In many engineering and physical applications the growth of a temporal free shear layer is of interest. The thickness of a free shear layer is usually measured by momentum thickness, which is defined as

$\theta = \int\limits_{y=-\infty}^{\infty}\left(\frac{1}{4} - \left(\frac{\left\langle u\right\rangle}{2U}\right)^2\right)\mathrm{d}y$

where $\left\langle u\right\rangle = \frac{1}{L}\int_{0}^{L}\ u(x,y,t) dx$ and $U$ is the freestream velocity. Momentum thickness has the dimension of length and the non-dimensional momentum thickness is given by $\theta_{ND} = \theta/L$. Momentum thickness can be used to measure the thickness of a vortex layer.

== See also ==
- Vortex ring
- Burgers vortex sheet
