= Philip Saffman =

British mathematician (1931–2008)

- Born: Philip Geoffrey Saffman; 19 March 1931; Leeds, England
- Died: 17 August 2008 (aged 77); Los Angeles
- Education: Roundhay School; University of Cambridge
- Known for: Saffman lift; Saffman turbulence; Saffman–Taylor finger; Saffman–Delbrück model; Vortex dynamics
- Spouse: Ruth Arion (m. 1954)
- Awards: Otto Laporte Award (1994); FRS (1988)
- Scientific career
- Fields: Fluid dynamics; Fluid mechanics
- Workplaces: California Institute of Technology; Royal Air Force; University of Cambridge; King's College London
- Doctoral advisor: George Batchelor
- Doctoral students: Francis Bretherton

Philip Geoffrey Saffman FRS (19 March 1931 – 17 August 2008) was a mathematician and the Theodore von Kármán Professor of Applied Mathematics and Aeronautics at the California Institute of Technology.

== Education and early life ==
Saffman was born to a Jewish family in Leeds, England, and educated at Roundhay School and Trinity College, Cambridge which he entered aged 15. He received his Bachelor of Arts degree in 1953, studied for Part III of the Cambridge Mathematical Tripos in 1954 and was awarded his PhD in 1956 for research supervised by George Batchelor.

== Career and research ==
Saffman started his academic career as a lecturer at the University of Cambridge, then joined King's College London as a Reader. Saffman joined the Caltech faculty in 1964 and was named the Theodore von Kármán Professor in 1995. According to Dan Meiron, Saffman "really was one of the leading figures in fluid mechanics," and he influenced almost every subfield of that discipline. He is known (with his co-author Geoffrey Ingram Taylor) for the Saffman–Taylor instability in viscous fingering of fluid boundaries, a phenomenon important for its applications in enhanced oil recovery, and for the Saffman–Delbrück model of protein diffusion in membranes which he published with his Caltech colleague and Pasadena neighbour Max Delbrück. He made important contributions to the theory of vorticity arising from the motion of ships and aircraft through water and air; his work on wake turbulence led the airlines to increase the minimum time between takeoffs of aircraft on the same runway. Saffman also studied the flow of spheroidal particles in a fluid, such as bubbles in a carbonated beverage or corpuscles in blood; his work overturned previous assumptions that inertia was an important factor in these particles' motion and showed instead that Non-Newtonian properties of fluids play a significant role.

Along with his many research papers, Saffman wrote a book, Vortex Dynamics, surveying a field to which he had been a principal contributor. Russel E. Caflisch writes that "This book should be read by everyone interested in vortex dynamics or fluid dynamics in general."

== Awards and honours ==
Saffman was elected a Fellow of the American Academy of Arts and Sciences and a Fellow of the Royal Society in 1986, and the recipient of the American Physical Society's Otto Laporte Award. His nomination for the Royal Society reads:

Distinguished for his important contributions to fluid mechanics in more than 140 papers characterised by originality, powerful mathematical analysis, and deep physical insight. The problems he has illuminated include the following: dispersion in porous media, fingering in a Hele-Shaw cell, the interaction of molecular and macroscopic mixing in turbulent fluid, the forces on a small particle in moving fluid, the effect of dust particles on stability of gas flows, the dynamics of homogeneous turbulence, the shear layers bounding a Taylor column, vortex rings, trailing line vortices from aircraft wings, stability of vortex streets, diffusion of macromolecules in cell walls, nonlinear gravity-capillary waves, and instability of finite-amplitude water waves.

== Personal life ==
Saffman was survived by his wife (Ruth Arion whom he married in 1954), three children (Mark, Louise, Emma), and eight grandchildren (Timothy, Gregory, Rae, Jenny, Nadine, Aaron, Miriam, Alexandra and Andrey).
