= Görtler vortices =

Instabilities in fluid dynamics

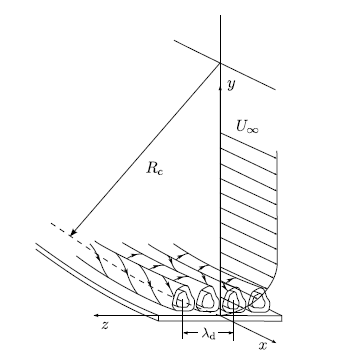
Görtler vortices in a boundary layer

In fluid dynamics, Görtler vortices are secondary flows that appear in a boundary layer flow along a concave wall. If the boundary layer is thin compared to the radius of curvature of the wall, the pressure remains constant across the boundary layer. On the other hand, if the boundary layer thickness is comparable to the radius of curvature, the centrifugal action creates a pressure variation across the boundary layer. This leads to the centrifugal instability (Görtler instability) of the boundary layer and consequent formation of Görtler vortices. These phenomena are named after mathematician Henry Görtler.

== Görtler number ==
The onset of Görtler vortices can be predicted using the dimensionless number called Görtler number (G). It is the ratio of centrifugal effects to the viscous effects in the boundary layer and is defined as

$$\mathrm{G} = \frac{U_e \theta}{\nu} \left( \frac{\theta}{R} \right)^{1/2}$$

where

$U_e$ = external velocity
$\theta$ = momentum thickness
$\nu$ = kinematic viscosity
$R$ = radius of curvature of the wall

Görtler instability occurs when G exceeds about 0.3.

== Other instances ==
A similar phenomenon arising from the same centrifugal action is sometimes observed in rotational flows which do not follow a curved wall, such as the rib vortices seen in the wakes of cylinders and generated behind moving structures. Vortices of this kind also form in a lid-driven cavity, near the streamline that separates the main vortex from the eddy in the downstream bottom corner.
