= Two-dimensional flow =

Type of fluid motion where all flow velocities are parallel to a fixed plane

In fluid mechanics, a two-dimensional flow is a form of fluid flow where the flow velocity at every point is parallel to a fixed plane. The velocity at any point on a given normal to that fixed plane should be constant.

== Flow velocity in two dimensional flows ==
=== Flow velocity in Cartesian co-ordinates ===
Considering a two dimensional flow in the $X-Y$ plane, the flow velocity at any point $(x,y,z)$ at time $t$ can be expressed as –

$$\bar{\boldsymbol{v}}(x,y,z,t) = v_x(x,y,z,t)\hat{\boldsymbol{i}} + v_y(x,y,z,t)\hat{\boldsymbol{j}}.$$

=== Velocity in cylindrical co-ordinates ===
Considering a two dimensional flow in the $r-\theta$ plane, the flow velocity at a point $(r,\theta,z)$ at a time $t$ can be expressed as –

$$\bar{\boldsymbol{v}}(r,\theta,z,t) = v_r(r,\theta,z,t)\hat{\boldsymbol{r}} + v_\theta(r,\theta,z,t)\hat{\boldsymbol{\theta}}.$$

== Vorticity in two dimensional flows ==
=== Vorticity in Cartesian co-ordinates ===
Vorticity in two dimensional flows in the $X-Y$ plane can be expressed as –

$$\bar{\boldsymbol{\omega}}=\omega_z\hat{\boldsymbol{k}},$$

$$\omega_z=\frac{\partial v_y}{\partial x}-\frac{\partial v_x}{\partial y}.$$

=== Vorticity in cylindrical co-ordinates ===
Vorticity in two dimensional flows in the $r-\theta$ plane can be expressed as –

$$\bar{\boldsymbol{\omega}}=\omega_z\hat{\boldsymbol{k}}$$

$$\omega_z=\frac{1}{r}\frac{\partial}{\partial r}(r\frac{\partial\psi}{\partial r}) + \frac{1}{r^2}\frac{\partial ^2 \psi}{\partial r^2}.$$

== Two dimensional sources and sinks ==
=== Line/point source ===
A line source is a line from which fluid appears and flows away on planes perpendicular to the line. When we consider 2-D flows on the perpendicular plane, a line source appears as a point source. By symmetry, we can assume that the fluid flows radially outward from the source. The strength of a source can be given by the volume flow rate $Q$ that it generates.

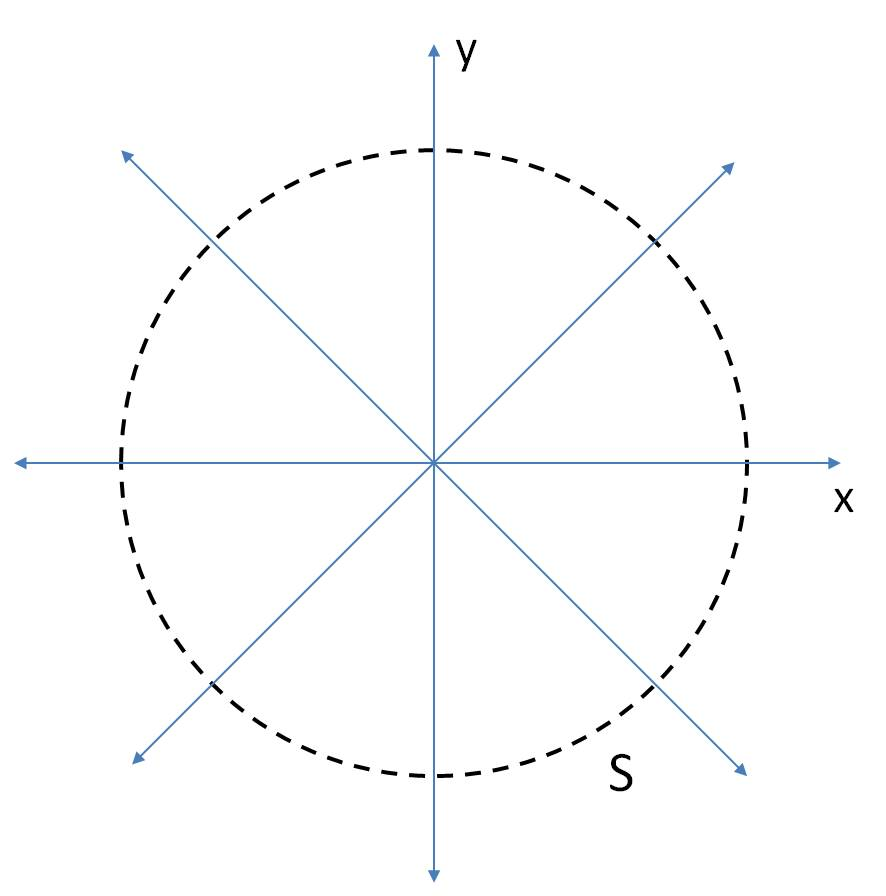
Fig 1 – Streamlines of flow generated by line source coincident with $Z$-axis

=== Line/point sink ===
Similar to a line source, a line sink is a line which absorbs fluid flowing towards it, from planes perpendicular to it. When we consider 2-D flows on the perpendicular plane, it appears as a point sink. By symmetry, we assume the fluid flows radially inwards towards the sink. The strength of a sink is given by the volume flow rate $Q$ of the fluid it absorbs.

== Types of two-dimensional flows ==
=== Uniform source flow ===
A radially symmetrical flow field directed outwards from a common point is called a source flow. The central common point is the line source described above. Fluid is supplied at a constant rate $Q$ from the source. As the fluid flows outward, the area of flow increases. As a result, to satisfy continuity equation, the velocity decreases and the streamlines spread out. The velocity at all points at a given distance from the source is the same.

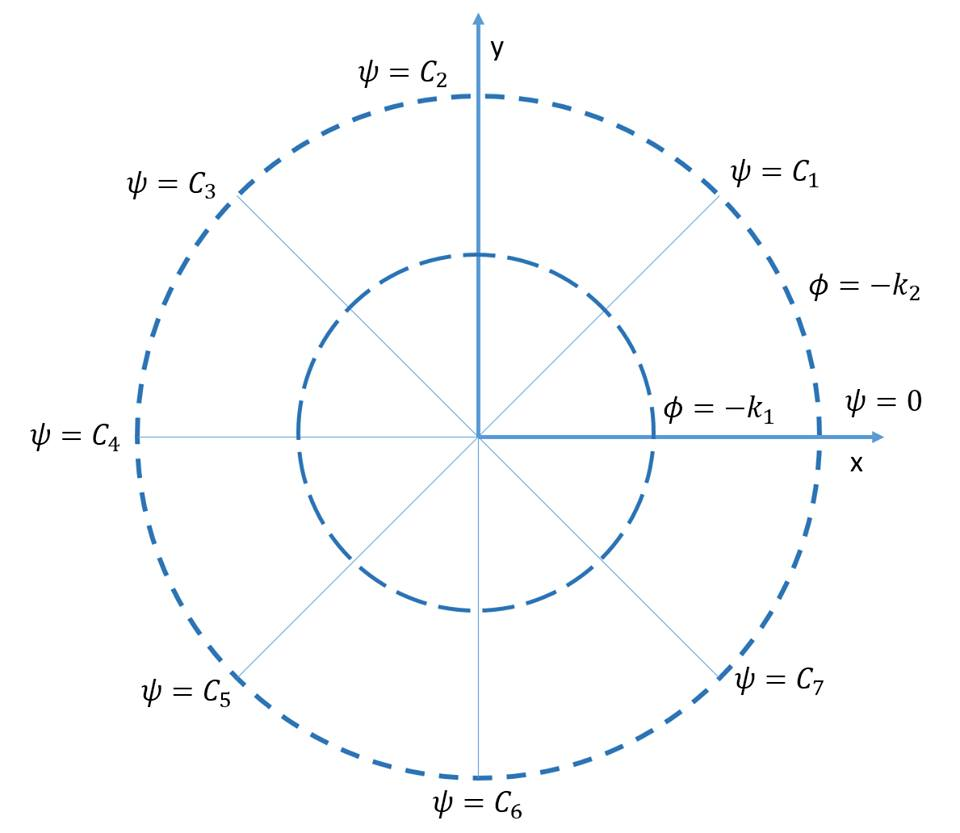
Fig 2 - Streamlines and potential lines for source flow

The velocity of fluid flow can be given as -

$$\bar{\boldsymbol{v}}= v_r(r)\hat{\boldsymbol{e}}_r.$$

We can derive the relation between flow rate and velocity of the flow. Consider a cylinder of unit height, coaxial with the source. The rate at which the source emits fluid should be equal to the rate at which fluid flows out of the surface of the cylinder.

$$\int\limits_S \bar{\boldsymbol{v}}\cdot{d\bar{\boldsymbol{S}}} = 2\pi r v_r(r)=Q,$$

$$\therefore \; \; v_r(r)=\frac{Q}{2\pi r}.$$

The stream function associated with source flow is –

$$\psi (r,\theta)= \frac{Q}{2\pi} \theta.$$

The steady flow from a point source is irrotational, and can be derived from velocity potential. The velocity potential is given by –

$$\phi (r,\theta)= \frac{Q}{2\pi} \ln r.$$

=== Uniform sink flow ===
Sink flow is the opposite of source flow. The streamlines are radial, directed inwards to the line source. As we get closer to the sink, area of flow decreases. In order to satisfy the continuity equation, the streamlines get bunched closer and the velocity increases as we get closer to the source. As with source flow, the velocity at all points equidistant from the sink is equal.

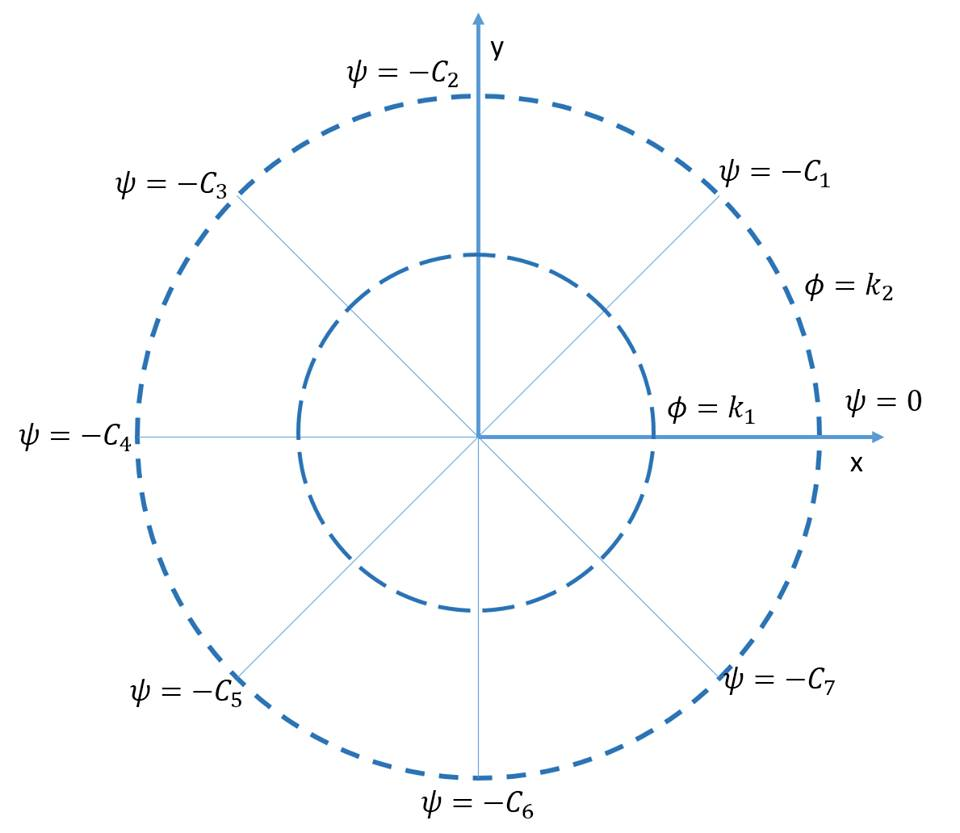
Fig 3 – Streamlines and potential lines for sink flow

The velocity of the flow around the sink can be given by –

$$\bar{\boldsymbol{v}}= -v_r(r) \hat{\boldsymbol{e}}_r,$$

$$v_r(r)=\frac{Q}{2\pi r}.$$

The stream function associated with sink flow is –

$$\psi (r,\theta)= -\frac{Q}{2\pi} \theta.$$

The flow around a line sink is irrotational and can be derived from velocity potential. The velocity potential around a sink can be given by –

$$\phi (r,\theta)= -\frac{Q}{2\pi} \ln r.$$

=== Irrotational vortex ===
A vortex is a region where the fluid flows around an imaginary axis. For an irrotational vortex, the flow at every point is such that a small particle placed there undergoes pure translation and does not rotate. Velocity varies inversely with radius in this case. Velocity will tend to $\inf$ at $r=0$ that is the reason for center being a singular point. The velocity is mathematically expressed as –

$$\boldsymbol{v} = v_\theta \hat{\boldsymbol{e}}_\theta,$$

$$v_\theta=\frac{K}{2\pi r}.$$

Since the fluid flows around an axis,

$$v_r = 0.$$

The stream function for irrotational vortices is given by –

$$\psi=-\frac{K}{2\pi}\ln r.$$

While the velocity potential is expressed as –

$$\phi=-\frac{K}{2\pi}\theta.$$

For the closed curve enclosing origin, circulation (line integral of velocity field) $\Gamma = K$ and for any other closed curves, $\Gamma = 0$

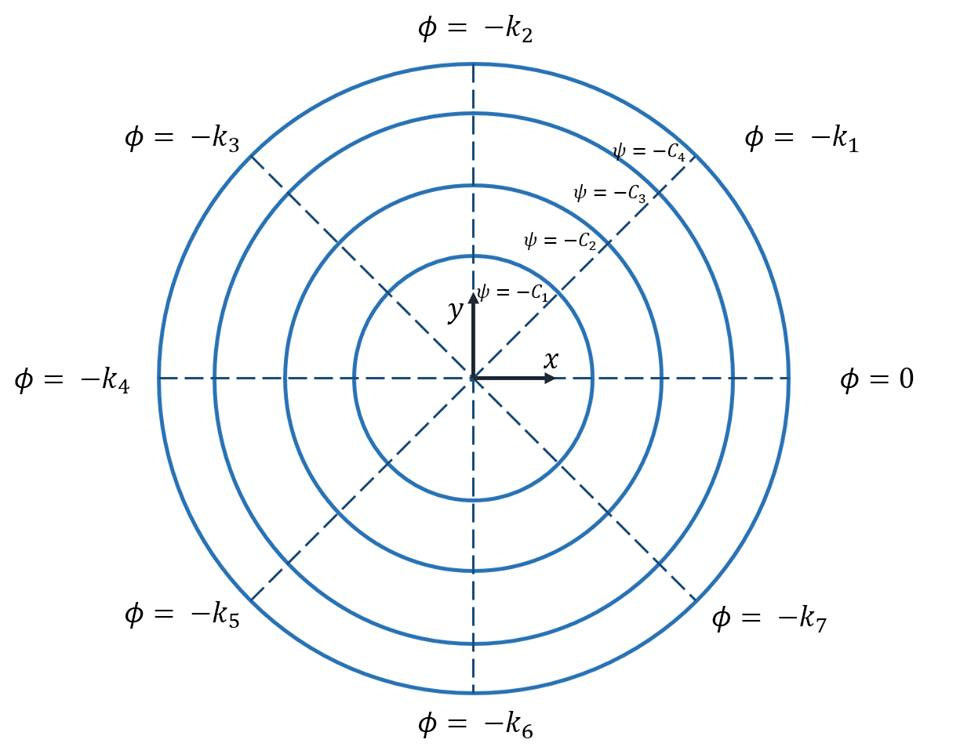
Fig 4 – Streamlines and potential lines for an irrotational vortex

=== Doublet ===
A doublet can be thought of as a combination of a source and a sink of equal strengths kept at an infinitesimally small distance apart. Thus the streamlines can be seen to start and end at the same point. The strength of a doublet made by a source and sink of strength $Q$ kept a distance $ds$ is given by –

$$\Lambda = Q\frac{ds}{2\pi}.$$

The velocity of fluid flow can be expressed as –

$$\boldsymbol{v} = v_r \hat{\boldsymbol{e}}_r + v_\theta \hat{\boldsymbol{e}}_\theta,$$

$$v_r = -\frac{\Lambda}{r^2}\cos\theta,$$

$$v_\theta = -\frac{\Lambda}{r^2}\sin\theta.$$

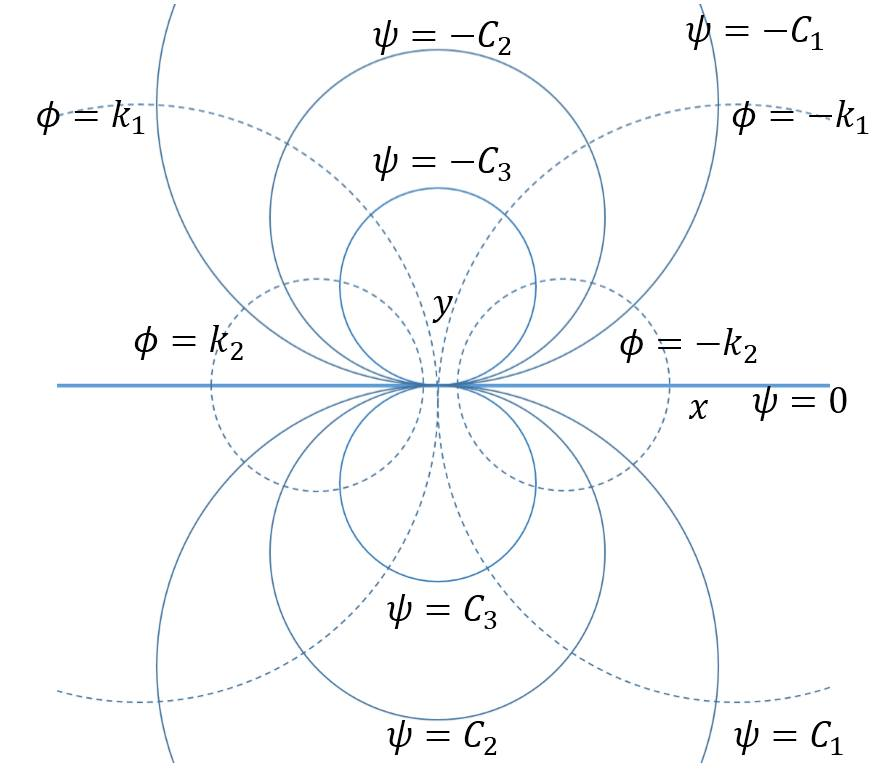
Fig 5 - Streamlines and potential lines for a doublet

The equations and the plot are for the limiting condition of $ds \rightarrow 0$

The concept of a doublet is very similar to that of electric dipoles and magnetic dipoles in electrodynamics.
