= Saffman–Delbrück model =

Mathematical model of lipid membranes

The Saffman–Delbrück model describes a lipid membrane as a thin layer of viscous fluid, surrounded by a less viscous bulk liquid. This picture was originally proposed to determine the diffusion coefficient of membrane proteins, but has also been used to describe the dynamics of fluid domains within lipid membranes. The Saffman–Delbrück formula is often applied to determine the size of an object embedded in a membrane from its observed diffusion coefficient, and is characterized by the weak logarithmic dependence of diffusion constant on object radius.

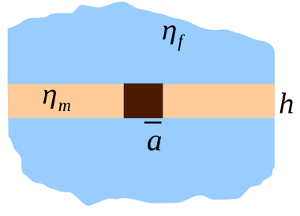
Embedded cylindrical object of radius $a$ in a membrane with viscosity $\eta_m$, height $h$, surrounded by bulk fluid with viscosity $\eta_f$

== Origin ==
In a three-dimensional highly viscous liquid, a spherical object of radius a has diffusion coefficient

$$D_{3D} = \frac{k_B T}{6 \pi \eta a}$$

by the well-known Stokes–Einstein relation. By contrast, the diffusion coefficient of a circular object embedded in a two-dimensional fluid diverges; this is Stokes' paradox. In a real lipid membrane, the diffusion coefficient may be limited by:

1. the size of the membrane
2. the inertia of the membrane (finite Reynolds number)
3. the effect of the liquid surrounding the membrane

Philip Saffman and Max Delbrück calculated the diffusion coefficient for these three cases, and showed that Case 3 was the relevant effect.

== Saffman–Delbrück formula ==
The diffusion coefficient of a cylindrical inclusion of radius $a$ in a membrane with thickness $h$ and viscosity $\eta_m$, surrounded by bulk fluid with viscosity $\eta_f$ is:

$$D_{sd} = \frac{k_B T}{4 \pi \eta_m h} \left[\ln(2 L_{sd} / a) - \gamma\right]$$

where the Saffman–Delbrück length $L_{sd} = \frac{h \eta_m}{2 \eta_f}$ and $\gamma\approx 0.577$ is the Euler–Mascheroni constant. Typical values of $L_{sd}$ are 0.1 to 10 micrometres. This result is an approximation applicable for radii $a \ll L_{sd}$, which is appropriate for proteins ($a\approx$ nm), but not for micrometre-scale lipid domains.

The Saffman–Delbrück formula predicts that diffusion coefficients $D_{sd}$ will only depend weakly on the size of the embedded object; for example, if $L_{sd} = 1 \mu m$, changing $a$ from 1 nm to 10 nm only reduces the diffusion coefficient $D_{sd}$ by 30%.

== Beyond the Saffman–Delbrück length ==
Hughes, Pailthorpe, and White extended the theory of Saffman and Delbrück to inclusions with any radii $a$; for $a \gg L_{sd}$,

$$D \to \frac{k_B T}{8 \eta_m h} \frac{L_{sd}}{a} = \frac{k_B T}{16 \eta_f a}$$

A useful formula that produces the correct diffusion coefficients between these two limits is

$$D = \frac{k_B T}{4 \pi \eta_m h} \left[\ln(2/\epsilon) - \gamma + 4\epsilon/\pi - (\epsilon^2/2)\ln(2/\epsilon)\right] \left[1 - (\epsilon^3/\pi) \ln(2/\epsilon) + c_1 \epsilon^{b_1} / (1 + c_2 \epsilon^{b_2}) \right]^{-1}$$

where $\epsilon = a / L_{sd}$, $b_1 = 2.74819$, $b_2 = 0.51465$, $c_1 = 0.73761$, and $c_2 = 0.52119$. Please note that the original version of has a typo in $b_2$; the value in the correction to that article should be used.

== Experimental studies ==
Though the Saffman–Delbruck formula is commonly used to infer the sizes of nanometer-scale objects, recent controversial experiments on proteins have suggested that the diffusion coefficient's dependence on radius $a$ should be $a^{-1}$ instead of $\ln(a)$. However, for larger objects (such as micrometre-scale lipid domains), the Saffman–Delbruck model (with the extensions above) is well-established

== Extending Saffman–Delbrück for Hydrodynamic Coupling of Proteins within Curved Lipid Bilayer Membranes ==
The Saffman–Delbrück approach has also been extended in recent works for modeling hydrodynamic interactions between proteins embedded within curved lipid bilayer membranes, such as in vesicles and other structures. These works use related formulations to study the roles of the membrane hydrodynamic coupling and curvature in the collective drift-diffusion dynamics of proteins within bilayer membranes. Various models of the protein inclusions within curved membranes have been developed, including models based on series truncations, immersed boundary methods, and fluctuating hydrodynamics.
