= Palinstrophy =

Curl of the vorticity

Palinstrophy is the curl of the vorticity. It is defined as $\frac{1}{2} \left( \nabla \times \omega \right),$ where $\omega$ is the vorticity.

Palinstrophy is mainly used in turbulence study, where there is a need to quantify how vorticity is transferred from one direction to the others. It is closely related to enstrophy, the latter being more equivalent to the "power" of vorticity.
