= Batchelor vortex =

In fluid dynamics, Batchelor vortices, first described by George Batchelor in a 1964 article, have been found useful in analyses of airplane vortex wake hazard problems.

== The model ==
The Batchelor vortex is an approximate solution to the Navier–Stokes equations obtained using a boundary layer approximation. The physical reasoning behind this approximation is the assumption that the axial gradient of the flow field of interest is of much smaller magnitude than the radial gradient.
The axial, radial and azimuthal velocity components of the vortex are denoted $U$,$V$ and $W$ respectively and can be represented in cylindrical coordinates $(x,r, \theta)$ as follows:

$$\begin{array}{cl}
U(r) &= U_\infty + \frac{W_0}{(R/R_0)^2} e^{-(r/R)^2}, \\
V(r) &= 0, \\
W(r) &= qW_0 \frac{1-e^{-(r/R)^2}}{(r/R_0)}.
\end{array}$$

The parameters in the above equations are

- $U_\infty$, the free-stream axial velocity,
- $W_0$, the velocity scale (used for nondimensionalization),
- $R_0$, the length scale (used for nondimensionalization),
- $R = R(t) = \sqrt{R_0^2 + 4 \nu t}$, a measure of the core size, with initial core size $R_0$ and $\nu$ representing viscosity,
- $q$, the swirl strength, given as a ratio between the maximum tangential velocity and the core velocity.

Note that the radial component of the velocity is zero and that the axial and azimuthal components depend only on $r$.
We now write the system above in dimensionless form by scaling time by a factor $R_0/W_0$. Using the same symbols for the dimensionless variables, the Batchelor vortex can be expressed in terms of the dimensionless variables as

$$\left\lbrace \begin{array}{cl}
U(r) &= a + \displaystyle{\frac{1}{1+ 4t/Re} e^{-r^2/(1+ 4t/Re)}}, \\
V(r) &= 0, \\
W(r) &= q \displaystyle{\frac{1-e^{-r^2/(1+ 4t/Re)}}{r}},
\end{array}\right.$$

where $a = U_\infty/W_0$ denotes the free stream axial velocity and $Re$ is the Reynolds number.

If one lets $a = 0$ and considers an infinitely large swirl number then the Batchelor vortex simplifies to the Lamb–Oseen vortex for the azimuthal velocity:

$$W_\Theta(r) = \frac{\Gamma}{2\pi r} \left ( 1-e^{-r^2/R_c^2} \right )$$

where $\Gamma$ is the circulation.
