= Taylor scraping flow =

Type of two-dimensional corner flow

Streamlines for α = 90°, with the geometry described below rotated by 180°, so that the sliding wall is on top and moves to the right, as in the lid-driven cavity. The velocity is the same at every distance along each dashed line through the corner, so it has no single value at the corner itself.

In fluid dynamics, Taylor scraping flow is a type of two-dimensional corner flow occurring when one of the wall is sliding over the other with constant velocity, named after G. I. Taylor.

== Flow description ==
Consider a plane wall located at $\theta=0$ in the cylindrical coordinates $(r,\theta)$, moving with a constant velocity $U$ towards the left. Consider another plane wall(scraper), at an inclined position, making an angle $\alpha$ from the positive $x$ direction and let the point of intersection be at $r=0$. This description is equivalent to moving the scraper towards right with velocity $U$. The problem is singular at $r=0$ because at the origin, the velocities are discontinuous, thus the velocity gradient is infinite there.

Taylor noticed that the inertial terms are negligible as long as the region of interest is within $r\ll\nu/U$( or, equivalently Reynolds number $Re = Ur/\nu \ll 1$), thus within the region the flow is essentially a Stokes flow. For example, George Batchelor gives a typical value for lubricating oil with velocity $U=10\text{ cm}/\text{s}$ as $r\ll0.4\text{ cm}$. Then for two-dimensional planar problem, the equation is

$$\nabla^4 \psi =0, \quad u_r = \frac 1 r \frac{\partial\psi}{\partial\theta}, \quad u_\theta = -\frac{\partial\psi}{\partial r}$$

where $\mathbf{v}=(u_r,u_\theta)$ is the velocity field and $\psi$ is the stream function. The boundary conditions are

$$\begin{align}
r>0,\ \theta =0: &\quad u_r = -U, \ u_\theta= 0\\
r>0,\ \theta =\alpha: &\quad u_r = 0, \ u_\theta= 0
\end{align}$$

== Solution ==
Attempting a separable solution of the form $\psi =U r f(\theta)$ reduces the problem to

$$f^{iv} + 2 f'' + f =0$$

with boundary conditions

$$f(0)=0,\ f'(0)=-1, \ f(\alpha)=0, \ f'(\alpha)=0$$

The solution is

$$f(\theta) = \frac{1}{\alpha^2 - \sin^2\alpha} [\theta \sin \alpha \sin (\alpha-\theta) - \alpha(\alpha-\theta) \sin\theta]$$

Therefore, the velocity field is

$$\begin{align}
u_r &= \frac{U}{\alpha^2 - \sin^2\alpha} \{ \sin \alpha [\sin(\alpha-\theta)-\theta\cos(\alpha-\theta)] + \alpha[\sin\theta - (\alpha-\theta)\cos\theta]\}\\
u_\theta &= -\frac{U}{\alpha^2 - \sin^2\alpha} [\theta \sin \alpha \sin (\alpha-\theta) - \alpha(\alpha-\theta) \sin\theta]
\end{align}$$

Pressure can be obtained through integration of the momentum equation

$$\nabla p = \mu \nabla^2\mathbf{v}, \quad p(r,\infty)=p_\infty$$

which gives,

$$p(r,\theta) - p_\infty = \frac{2\mu U}{r} \frac{\alpha\sin\theta+\sin\alpha\sin(\alpha-\theta)}{\alpha^2 - \sin^2\alpha}$$

== Stresses on the scraper ==
Stresses on the scraper

The tangential stress and the normal stress on the scraper due to pressure and viscous forces are

$$\sigma_t = \frac{2\mu U}{r} \frac{\sin\alpha-\alpha\cos\alpha}{\alpha^2 - \sin^2\alpha}, \quad \sigma_n =\frac{2\mu U}{r} \frac{\alpha\sin\alpha}{\alpha^2 - \sin^2\alpha}$$

The same scraper stress if resolved according to Cartesian coordinates (parallel and perpendicular to the lower plate i.e. $\sigma_x = -\sigma_t \cos\alpha + \sigma_n \sin\alpha, \ \sigma_y = \sigma_t \sin\alpha + \sigma_n \cos\alpha$) are

$$\sigma_x = \frac{2\mu U}{r} \frac{\alpha-\sin\alpha\cos\alpha}{\alpha^2 - \sin^2\alpha}, \quad \sigma_y =\frac{2\mu U}{r} \frac{\sin^2\alpha}{\alpha^2 - \sin^2\alpha}$$

As noted earlier, all the stresses become infinite at $r=0$, because the velocity gradient is infinite there. In real life, there will be a huge pressure at the point, which depends on the geometry of the contact. The stresses are shown in the figure as given in the Taylor's original paper.

The stress in the direction parallel to the lower wall decreases as $\alpha$ increases, and reaches its minimum value $\sigma_x = 2\mu U/r$ at $\alpha=\pi$. Taylor says: "The most interesting and perhaps unexpected feature of the calculations is that $\sigma_y$ does not change sign in the range $0<\alpha<\pi$. In the range $\pi/2<\alpha<\pi$ the contribution to $\sigma_y$ due to normal stress is of opposite sign to that due to tangential stress, but the latter is the greater. The palette knives used by artists for removing paint from their palettes are very flexible scrapers. They can therefore only be used at such an angle that $\sigma_n$ is small and as will be seen in the figure this occurs only when $\alpha$ is nearly $180^\circ$. In fact artists instinctively hold their palette knives in this position." Further he adds "A plasterer on the other hand holds a smoothing tool so that $\alpha$ is small. In that way he can get the large values of $\sigma_y/\sigma_x$ which are needed in forcing plaster from protuberances to hollows."

== Scraping a power-law fluid ==
Since scraping applications are important for non-Newtonian fluid (for example, scraping paint, nail polish, cream, butter, honey, etc.,), it is essential to consider this case. The analysis was carried out by J. Riedler and Wilhelm Schneider in 1983 and they were able to obtain self-similar solutions for power-law fluids satisfying the relation for the apparent viscosity

$$\mu = m_z\left\{4\left[\frac{\partial}{\partial r}\left(\frac{1}{r}\frac{\partial \psi}{\partial \theta}\right)\right]^2 + \left[\frac{1}{r^2} \frac{\partial^2\psi}{\partial \theta^2} - r \frac{\partial}{\partial r}\left(\frac{1}{r}\frac{\partial}{\partial r}\right)\right]^2\right\}^{(n-1)/2}$$

where $m_z$ and $n$ are constants. The solution for the streamfunction of the flow created by the plate moving towards right is given by

$$\psi = Ur\left\{\left[1-\frac{\mathcal J_1(\theta)}{\mathcal J_1(\alpha)}\right]\sin\theta + \frac{\mathcal J_2(\theta)}{\mathcal J_1(\alpha)}\cos\theta\right\}$$

where

$$\begin{align}
\mathcal J_1 &= \mathrm{sgn}(F) \int_0^\theta |F|^{1/n} \cos x\, dx,\\
\mathcal J_2 &= \mathrm{sgn}(F) \int_0^\theta |F|^{1/n} \sin x\, dx
\end{align}$$

and

$$\begin{align}
F = \sin(\sqrt{n(2-n)}x-C)\quad \text{if}\, n<2,\\
F= \sqrt{x-C}\qquad \qquad \qquad \quad\text{if}\, n=2,\\
F=\sinh(\sqrt{n(n-2)}x-C)\quad \text{if}\, n>2
\end{align}$$

where $C$ is the root of $\mathcal J_2(\alpha)=0$. It can be verified that this solution reduces to that of Taylor's for Newtonian fluids, i.e., when $n=1$.
