= Vortex stretching =

Lengthening of vortices in 3D fluid flow

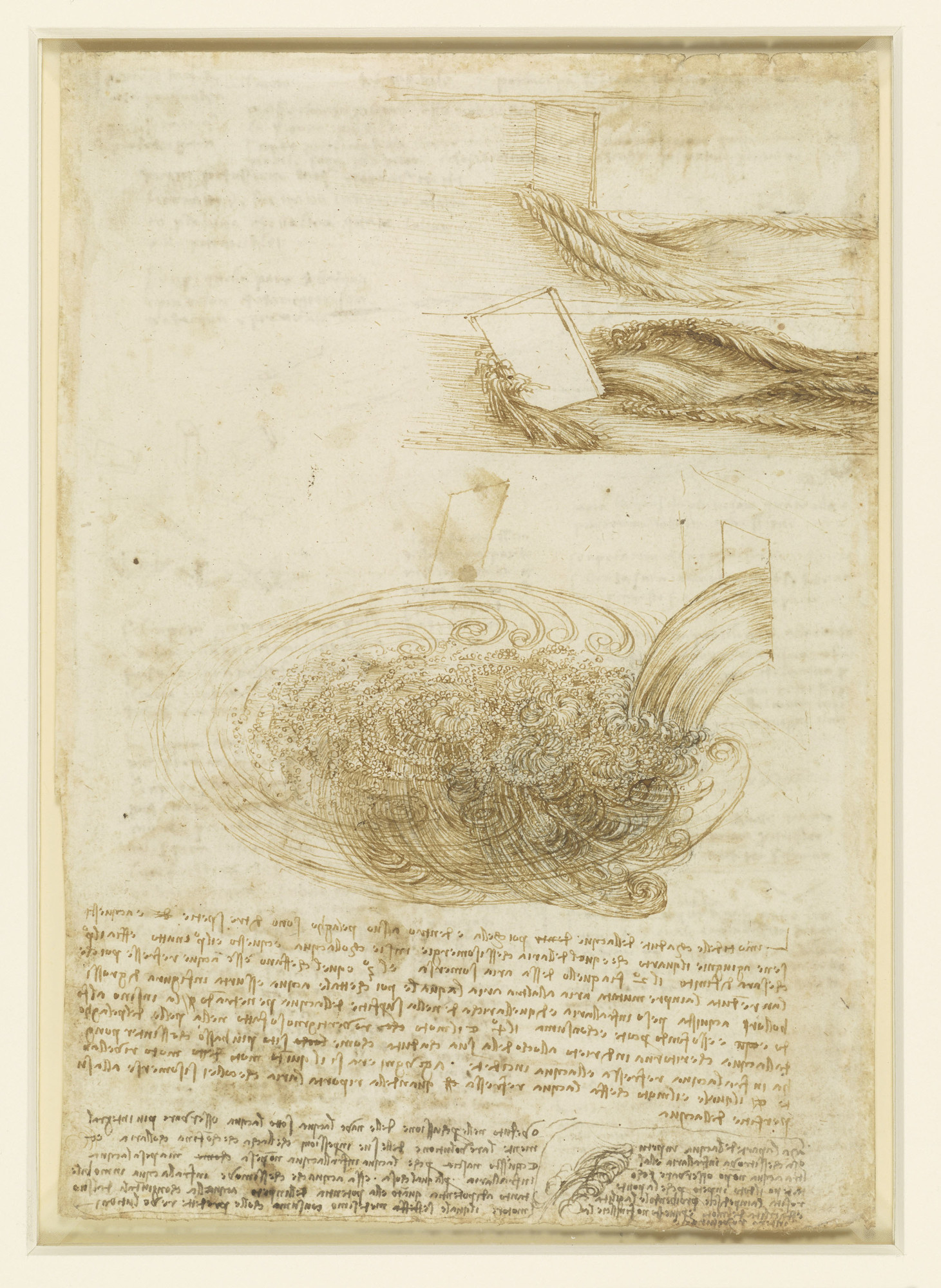
Studies of vortices in turbulent fluid motion by Leonardo da Vinci.

In fluid dynamics, vortex stretching is the lengthening of vortices in three-dimensional fluid flow, associated with a corresponding increase of the component of vorticity in the stretching direction—due to the conservation of angular momentum.

Vortex stretching is associated with a particular term in the vorticity equation. For example, vorticity transport in an incompressible inviscid flow is governed by

$${D\vec{\omega} \over Dt} = \left(\vec{\omega} \cdot \vec{\nabla}\right) \vec{v},$$

where D/Dt is the material derivative. The source term on the right hand side is the vortex stretching term. It amplifies the vorticity $\vec{\omega}$ when the velocity is diverging in the direction parallel to $\vec{\omega}$.

A simple example of vortex stretching in a viscous flow is provided by the Burgers vortex.

Vortex stretching is at the core of the description of the turbulence energy cascade from the large scales to the small scales in turbulence. In turbulence, fluid elements are, on average, more lengthened than squeezed. In the end, this results in more vortex stretching than vortex squeezing. For incompressible flow—due to volume conservation of fluid elements—the lengthening implies thinning of the fluid elements in the directions perpendicular to the stretching direction. This reduces the radial length scale of the associated vorticity. Finally, at the small scales of the order of the Kolmogorov microscales, the turbulence kinetic energy is dissipated into heat through the action of molecular viscosity.
