= Keith Moffatt =

British mathematician and physicist

- Born: 12 April 1935 (age 91); Edinburgh, Scotland
- Other name: Henry Keith Moffatt
- Education: University of Edinburgh; University of Cambridge
- Known for: Moffatt eddies Helicity; Non-axisymmetric Burgers vortices
- Awards: Smith's Prize (1960); Fellow of the Royal Society (1986); Senior Whitehead Prize (2005); Hughes Medal (2005); David Crighton Medal (2009)
- Scientific career
- Fields: magnetohydrodynamics
- Workplaces: University of Cambridge
- Thesis: Magnetohydrodynamic Turbulence (1962)
- Doctoral advisor: George Batchelor
- Doctoral students: Michael Proctor; Renzo Ricca; Andrew Soward

Henry Keith Moffatt, FRS FRSE (born 12 April 1935) is a British mathematician with research interests in the field of fluid dynamics, particularly magnetohydrodynamics and the theory of turbulence. He was Professor of Mathematical Physics at the University of Cambridge from 1980 to 2002.

== Early life and education ==
Moffatt was born on 12 April 1935 to Emmeline Marchant and Frederick Henry Moffatt. He was schooled at George Watson's College, Edinburgh, going on to study Mathematical Sciences at the University of Edinburgh, graduating in 1957. He then went to Trinity College, Cambridge, where he studied mathematics and, 1959, he was a Wrangler. In 1960, he was awarded a Smith's Prize while preparing his PhD degree. He received his doctorate in 1962; his dissertation, Magnetohydrodynamic Turbulence, was supervised by George Batchelor.

== Career ==
After completing his doctorate, Moffatt joined the staff of the Mathematics Faculty at the University of Cambridge as an Assistant Lecturer and became a Fellow of Trinity College. He was appointed a lecturer in 1964, and held the office of Tutor, then Senior Tutor, at Trinity between 1970 and 1976.

In 1977, he was appointed to the Chair of Applied Mathematics at the University of Bristol. He held this position until 1980 when he returned to Cambridge to take up the Chair in Mathematical Physics, renewing his Fellowship of Trinity College. In 2002, he was made an Emeritus Professor of the University (he remains a Fellow of Trinity).

He held the Chaire Internationale de Recherche Blaise Pascal at the École Normale Supérieure, Paris, from 2001 to 2003, and was Leverhulme Professor, from 2003 to 2005. He was president of the International Union of Theoretical and Applied Mechanics from 2000 to 2004.

== Publications ==
Moffatt has published more than 200 papers. He is the author or co-author of books including:

- Keith Moffatt (1978). Magnetic Field Generation in Electrically Conducting Fluids. Cambridge University Press. ISBN 9780521216401. 2nd ed., 1983.
- Keith Moffatt; Emmanuel Dormy (2019). Self-Exciting Fluid Dynamos. Cambridge University Press. ISBN 9781108717052.

He also co-edited

- G. K. Batchelor; H. K. Moffatt; M. G. Worster, eds. (2000). Perspectives in Fluid Dynamics: A Collective Introduction to Current Research. Cambridge University Press.
- H. K. Moffatt; Emily Shuckburgh, eds. (2011). Environmental Hazards: The Fluid Dynamics and Geophysics of Extreme Events. World Scientific.

== Honours and awards ==
Moffatt was elected Fellow of the Royal Society in 1986; Fellow of the Royal Society of Edinburgh in 1988; Foreign Member of the Royal Netherlands Academy of Arts and Sciences in 1991; Member of Academia Europæa in 1994; Foreign Member of the Académie des Sciences, Paris, in 1998; Foreign Member of the Accademia Nazionale dei Lincei, Rome, in 2001; Fellow of the American Physical Society in 2003; and a foreign associate of the National Academy of Sciences in 2008.

He became an officier in the Ordre des Palmes académiques in 1998. He received the Panetti-Ferrari International Prize and Gold Medal of the Academy of Sciences of Turin in 2001, the Euromech Prize for Fluid Mechanics in 2003, the Caribbean Award for Fluid Dynamics in 2004, the Senior Whitehead Prize of the London Mathematical Society in 2005, and the Hughes Medal of the Royal Society in 2005.

== Personal life ==
In 1960, he married Katharine (Linty), and together they had four children, two daughters and two sons, one of whom is deceased.
