= Vorticity equation =

Equation describing the evolution of the vorticity of a fluid particle as it flows

The vorticity equation of fluid dynamics describes the evolution of the vorticity ω of a particle of a fluid as it moves with its flow; that is, the local rotation of the fluid (in terms of vector calculus this is the curl of the flow velocity). The governing equation is:

$$\begin{align}
\frac{D\boldsymbol\omega}{Dt} &= \frac{\partial \boldsymbol \omega}{\partial t} + (\mathbf u \cdot \nabla) \boldsymbol \omega \\
&= (\boldsymbol \omega \cdot \nabla) \mathbf u - \boldsymbol \omega (\nabla \cdot \mathbf u) + \frac{1}{\rho^2}\nabla \rho \times \nabla p + \nabla \times \left( \frac{\nabla \cdot \tau}{\rho} \right) + \nabla \times \left( \frac{\mathbf B}{\rho} \right) \end{align}$$

where D/Dt is the material derivative operator, u is the flow velocity, ρ is the local fluid density, p is the local pressure, τ is the viscous stress tensor and B represents the sum of the external body forces. The first source term on the right hand side represents vortex stretching.

The equation is valid in the absence of any concentrated torques and line forces for a compressible, Newtonian fluid. In the case of incompressible flow (i.e., low Mach number) and isotropic fluids, with conservative body forces, the equation simplifies to the vorticity transport equation:

$$\frac{D\boldsymbol\omega}{Dt} = \left(\boldsymbol{\omega} \cdot \nabla\right) \mathbf{u} + \nu \nabla^2 \boldsymbol{\omega}$$

where ν is the kinematic viscosity and $\nabla^{2}$ is the Laplace operator. Under the further assumption of two-dimensional flow, the equation simplifies to:

$$\frac{D\boldsymbol\omega}{Dt} =  \nu \nabla^2 \boldsymbol{\omega}$$

== Physical interpretation ==
- The term Dω/Dt on the left-hand side is the material derivative of the vorticity vector ω. It describes the rate of change of vorticity of the moving fluid particle. This change can be attributed to unsteadiness in the flow (∂ω/∂t, the unsteady term) or due to the motion of the fluid particle as it moves from one point to another ((u ∙ ∇)ω, the convection term).
- The term (ω ∙ ∇) u on the right-hand side describes the stretching or tilting of vorticity due to the flow velocity gradients. Note that (ω ∙ ∇) u is a vector quantity, as ω ∙ ∇ is a scalar differential operator, while ∇u is a nine-element tensor quantity.
- The term ω(∇ ∙ u) describes stretching of vorticity due to flow compressibility. It follows from the Navier-Stokes equation for continuity, namely
  $$\begin{align}
\frac{\partial\rho}{\partial t} + \nabla \cdot\left(\rho \mathbf u\right) &= 0 \\
\Longleftrightarrow \nabla \cdot \mathbf{u} &= -\frac{1}{\rho}\frac{d\rho}{dt} = \frac{1}{v}\frac{dv}{dt}
\end{align}$$
  where v = 1/ρ is the specific volume of the fluid element. One can think of ∇ ∙ u as a measure of flow compressibility. Sometimes the negative sign is included in the term.
- The term 1/ρ^{2}∇ρ × ∇p is the baroclinic term. It accounts for the changes in the vorticity due to the intersection of density and pressure surfaces.
- The term ∇ × ((∇ ∙ τ)/ρ) accounts for the diffusion of vorticity due to the viscous effects.
- The term ∇ × B provides for changes due to external body forces. These are forces that are spread over a three-dimensional region of the fluid, such as gravity or electromagnetic forces. (As opposed to forces that act only over a surface (like drag on a wall) or a line (like surface tension around a meniscus).

=== Simplifications ===
- In case of conservative body forces, ∇ × B = 0.
- For a barotropic fluid, ∇ρ × ∇p = 0. This is also true for a constant density fluid (including incompressible fluid) where ∇ρ = 0. Note that this is not the same as an incompressible flow, for which the barotropic term cannot be neglected.
  - This note seems to be talking about the fact that conservation of momentum says $\frac{D \rho}{D t} + \rho (\nabla \cdot \mathbf u) = \frac{\partial \rho}{\partial t} + \mathbf u \cdot \nabla \rho + \rho (\nabla \cdot \mathbf u) = 0$ and there's a difference between assuming that ρ=constant (the 'incompressible fluid' option, above) and that $\nabla \cdot \mathbf u = 0$ (the 'incompressible flow' option, above). With the first assumption, conservation of momentum implies (for non-zero density) that $\nabla \cdot \mathbf u = 0$; whereas the second assumption doesn't necessary imply that ρ is constant. This second assumption only strictly requires that the time rate of change of the density is compensated by the gradient of the density, as in:$\frac{\partial \rho}{\partial t} = - \mathbf u \cdot \nabla \rho$. You can make sense of this by considering the ideal gas law p = ρRT (which is valid if the Reynolds number is large enough that viscous friction becomes unimportant). Then, even for an adiabatic, chemically-homogenous fluid, the density can vary when the pressure changes, e.g. with Bernoulli.
- For inviscid fluids, the viscosity tensor τ is zero.

Thus for an inviscid, barotropic fluid with conservative body forces, the vorticity equation simplifies to

$$\frac{D}{Dt} \left( \frac{\boldsymbol \omega}{\rho} \right) = \left( \frac{\boldsymbol\omega}{\rho} \right) \cdot \nabla \mathbf u$$

Alternately, in case of incompressible, inviscid fluid with conservative body forces,

$\frac{D \boldsymbol \omega}{Dt} = \frac{\partial \boldsymbol \omega}{\partial t} + (\mathbf u \cdot \nabla)\boldsymbol \omega = (\boldsymbol \omega \cdot \nabla) \mathbf u$

For a brief review of additional cases and simplifications, see also. For the vorticity equation in turbulence theory, in context of the flows in oceans and atmosphere, refer to.

== Derivation ==
The vorticity equation can be derived from the Navier–Stokes equation for the conservation of angular momentum. In the absence of any concentrated torques and line forces, one obtains:

$$\frac{D \mathbf{u}}{D t} = \frac{\partial \mathbf{u}}{\partial t} + \left(\mathbf{u} \cdot \nabla\right) \mathbf{u} = -\frac{1}{\rho} \nabla p + \frac{\nabla \cdot \tau}{\rho} + \frac{\mathbf{B}}{\rho}$$

Now, vorticity is defined as the curl of the flow velocity vector; taking the curl of momentum equation yields the desired equation. The following identities are useful in derivation of the equation:

$$\begin{align}
\boldsymbol{\omega} &= \nabla \times \mathbf{u} \\
\left(\mathbf{u} \cdot \nabla\right)\mathbf{u}
&= \nabla \left(\frac{1}{2}\mathbf{u} \cdot \mathbf{u}\right) - \mathbf{u} \times \boldsymbol\omega \\
\nabla \times \left(\mathbf{u} \times \boldsymbol{\omega} \right)
&= -\boldsymbol{\omega} \left(\nabla \cdot \mathbf{u}\right) + \left(\boldsymbol{\omega} \cdot \nabla\right) \mathbf{u} - \left(\mathbf{u} \cdot \nabla\right) \boldsymbol{\omega} \\[4pt]
\nabla \cdot \boldsymbol{\omega} &= 0 \\[4pt]
\nabla \times \nabla \phi &= 0
\end{align}$$

where $\phi$ is any scalar field.

== Tensor notation ==
The vorticity equation can be expressed in tensor notation using Einstein's summation convention and the Levi-Civita symbol e_{ijk}:

$$\begin{align}
\frac{D\omega_i}{Dt} &= \frac{\partial \omega_i}{\partial t} + v_j \frac{\partial \omega_i}{\partial x_j} \\
&= \omega_j \frac{\partial v_i}{\partial x_j} - \omega_i \frac{\partial v_j}{\partial x_j}
+ e_{ijk}\frac{1}{\rho^2}\frac{\partial \rho}{\partial x_j}\frac{\partial p}{\partial x_k}
+ e_{ijk}\frac{\partial}{\partial x_j}\left(\frac{1}{\rho}\frac{\partial \tau_{km}}{\partial x_m}\right)
+ e_{ijk}\frac{\partial B_k }{\partial x_j} \end{align}$$

== In specific sciences ==
=== Atmospheric sciences ===
In the atmospheric sciences, the vorticity equation can be stated in terms of the absolute vorticity of air with respect to an inertial frame, or of the vorticity with respect to the rotation of the Earth. The absolute version is

$$\frac{d\eta}{dt} = -\eta\nabla_\text{h} \cdot \mathbf{v}_\text{h} - \left(
\frac{\partial w}{\partial x} \frac{\partial v}{\partial z} -
\frac{\partial w}{\partial y} \frac{\partial u}{\partial z}
\right) -
\frac{1}{\rho^2}\mathbf{k} \cdot \left(\nabla_\text{h} p \times \nabla_\text{h}\rho\right)$$

Here, η is the polar (z) component of the vorticity, ρ is the atmospheric density, u, v, and w are the components of wind velocity, and ∇_{h} is the 2-dimensional (i.e. horizontal-component-only) del.

== See also ==
- Vorticity
- Barotropic vorticity equation
- Vortex stretching
- Burgers vortex
