= Enstrophy =

Concept in fluid dynamics

In fluid dynamics, the enstrophy $\mathcal{E}$ can be interpreted as another type of potential density; or, more concretely, the quantity directly related to the kinetic energy in the flow model that corresponds to dissipation effects in the fluid. It is particularly useful in the study of turbulent flows, and is often identified in the study of thrusters as well as in combustion theory and meteorology.

Given a domain $\Omega \subseteq \R^n$ and a once-weakly differentiable vector field $u \in H^1(\R^n)^n$ which represents a fluid flow, such as a solution to the Navier-Stokes equations, its enstrophy is given by:

$\mathcal{E}({\bf u}) := \int_\Omega |\nabla \mathbf{u}|^2 \, d \mathbf x$

where $|\nabla \mathbf{u}|^2 = \sum_{i,j=1}^n \left| \partial_i u^j \right|^2$. This quantity is the squared seminorm $|\mathbf{u}|_{H^1(\Omega)^n}^2$ in the Sobolev space $H^1(\Omega)^n$.

== Incompressible flow ==
In the case that the flow is incompressible, or equivalently that $\nabla \cdot \mathbf{u} = 0$, the enstrophy can be described as the integral of the square of the vorticity $\mathbf{\omega}$:

$$\mathcal{E}(\boldsymbol \omega) \equiv \int_\Omega |\boldsymbol \omega|^2 \,d \mathbf x$$

or, in terms of the flow velocity:

$$\mathcal{E}(\mathbf{u}) \equiv \int_\Omega |\nabla \times \mathbf u|^2 \,d \mathbf x$$

In the context of the incompressible Navier-Stokes equations, enstrophy appears in the following useful result:

$$\frac{d}{dt} \left( \frac{1}{2} \int_\Omega |\mathbf{u}|^2 \right) = - \nu \mathcal{E}(\mathbf{u})$$

The quantity in parentheses on the left is the kinetic energy in the flow, so the result says that energy declines proportional to the kinematic viscosity $\nu$ times the enstrophy.

== See also ==
- Atmospheric circulation
- Turbulence
