= George Batchelor =

Australian mathematician and physicist

George Keith Batchelor
- George Keith Batchelor
- Born: 8 March 1920; Melbourne, Australia
- Died: 30 March 2000 (aged 80); Cambridge, England
- Education: University of Melbourne
- Known for: Batchelor vortex Prandtl–Batchelor theorem Batchelor–Chandrasekhar equation Batchelor scale
- Awards: Adams Prize (1950); Royal Medal (1988); Timoshenko Medal (1988)
- Scientific career
- Fields: Applied mathematics Fluid dynamics
- Workplaces: University of Cambridge
- Doctoral advisor: Geoffrey Ingram Taylor
- Doctoral students: Philip Saffman; Keith Moffatt; Adrian Gill; John Hinch; Tim Pedley

George Keith Batchelor FRS (8 March 1920 – 30 March 2000) was an Australian applied mathematician and fluid dynamicist.

He was for many years a professor of applied mathematics in the University of Cambridge, and was founding head of the Department of Applied Mathematics and Theoretical Physics (DAMTP). In 1956 he founded the influential Journal of Fluid Mechanics which he edited for some forty years. Prior to Cambridge he studied at Melbourne High School and University of Melbourne.

As an applied mathematician (and for some years at Cambridge a co-worker with Sir Geoffrey Taylor in the field of turbulent flow), he was a keen advocate of the need for physical understanding and sound experimental basis.

His An Introduction to Fluid Dynamics (CUP, 1967) is still considered a classic of the subject, and has been re-issued in the Cambridge Mathematical Library series, following strong current demand. Unusual for an 'elementary' textbook of that era, it presented a treatment in which the properties of a real viscous fluid were fully emphasised. He was elected a Foreign Honorary Member of the American Academy of Arts and Sciences in 1959.

The Batchelor Prize award, is named in his honour and is awarded every four years at the meeting of the International Congress on Theoretical and Applied Mechanics.
