= Andrea Prosperetti =

- Education: University of Milan; California Institute of Technology
- Awards: Otto Laporte Award (2002)
- Scientific career
- Workplaces: Johns Hopkins University; University of Houston; University of Twente
- Doctoral advisor: Milton S. Plesset

Andrea Prosperetti is the Distinguished Professor of Mechanical Engineering at the University of Houston, the Berkhoff Professor of Applied Physics at the University of Twente in the Netherlands and an elected member of the National Academy of Engineering in 2012 ("for contributions to the fundamentals and applications of multiphase flows"). He is known for his work in the field of multiphase flows including bubble dynamics and cavitation.

He was the editor-in-chief of the International Journal of Multiphase Flow and serves on the editorial board of the Annual Review of Fluid Mechanics. He completed his doctoral work in 1974 at the California Institute of Technology under the supervision of Milton Plesset (of the Rayleigh–Plesset equation and Møller–Plesset perturbation theory) and holds a B.S. in Physics from Universitá di Milano, Italy (1968).

Prosperetti was awarded the Fluid Dynamics Prize (the highest award in Fluid Mechanics) by the American Physical Society in 2003 "for breakthroughs in the theory of multiphase flows, the dynamics of bubble oscillations, underwater sound, and free-surface flows and for providing elegant explanations of paradoxical phenomena in these fields". In 2012, the Acoustical Society of America awarded him the Silver Medal in Physical Acoustics "for contributions to bubble dynamics and multiphase flow." In addition, Prosperetti also won the 2014 EUROMECH Fluid Mechanics Prize (administered by the Council of the European Mechanics Society), the Lifetime Achievement Award in 2001 by the Japan Society of Multiphase Flow, and the Fluids Engineering Award in 2005 by the American Society of Mechanical Engineers. He is a fellow of the Acoustical Society of America, the American Physical Society, and the American Society of Mechanical Engineers. He has been a foreign member of the Royal Netherlands Academy of Arts and Sciences since 2000.

He is the author of "Advanced Mathematics for Applications", a reference textbook for graduate-level engineers and also of "Computational Methods for Multiphase Flows", both published by the Cambridge University Press.
