= Cavitation modelling =

Type of computational fluid dynamic

Cavitation modelling is a type of computational fluid dynamic (CFD) that represents the flow of fluid during cavitation. It covers a wide range of applications, such as pumps, water turbines, pump inducers, and fuel cavitation in orifices as commonly encountered in fuel injection systems.

== Modelling categories ==
Modelling efforts can be divided into two broad categories: vapor transport models and discrete bubble models.

=== Vapor transport model ===
Vapor transport models are best suited to large-scale cavitation, like sheet cavitation that often occurs on rudders and propellers. These models include two-way interactions between the phases.

=== Discrete bubble model ===
The discrete bubble model includes the effects of the surrounding fluid on the bubbles. Discrete bubble models, e.g. the Rayleigh-Plesset, Gilmore and Keller-Miksis, describe the relation between the external pressure, bubble radius and the velocity and acceleration of the bubble wall.

== Two-phase modeling ==
Two-phase modeling is the modelling of the two phases, as in a free surface code. Two common types of two phase models are homogeneous mixture models and sharp interface models. The difference between both the models is in the treatment of the contents of cells containing both phases.

=== Homogeneous mixture models ===
Most recent cavitation modelling efforts have used homogeneous mixture models, in which the contents of individual cells are assumed to be uniform. This approach is best suited to modeling large numbers of bubbles that are much smaller than one cell. The disadvantage of this approach is that when the cavities are larger than one cell, the vapor fraction is diffused across neighboring cells by the vapor transport model.

This is different from the sharp interface models in that the vapor and liquid are modeled as distinct phases separated by an interface.

=== Sharp interface models ===
In sharp interface models, the interface is not diffused by advection. The model maintains a sharp interface. Naturally, this is only appropriate when the bubble size is at least on the order of a few cells.

== Phase change models ==
Phase change models represent the mass transfer between the phases. In cavitation, pressure is responsible for the mass transfer between liquid and vapor phases. This is in contrast to boiling, in which the temperature causes the phase change. There are two general categories of phase change models used for cavitation: the barotropic models and equilibrium models. This section will briefly discuss the advantages and disadvantages of each type.

=== Barotropic model ===
If the pressure is greater than vapor pressure, then the fluid is liquid, otherwise vapor. This means density of liquid water is considered as the density of fluid if the pressure is greater than vapor pressure and the density of water vapor is considered when pressure is less than vapor pressure of water at the ambient temperature.

=== Equilibrium model ===
The equilibrium model requires the solution of the energy equation. The equation for state of water is used, with the energy absorbed or released by phase change creating local temperature gradients which control the rate of phase change.

== Bubble dynamics models ==
Several models for the bubble dynamics have been proposed:

=== Rayleigh ===
The Rayleigh model is the oldest, dating from 1917. This model was derived by Lord Rayleigh It describes an empty space in the water, influenced by a constant external pressure. His assumption of an empty space led to the name cavity still used. The Rayleigh equation, derived from the Navier-Stokes equation for a spherically symmetric bubble convected with the flow with constant external pressure, reads

$$R\ddot{R} +\frac{3}{2}\dot{R}^2 =\frac{p(R)-p_\infty}{\rho_L}$$

=== Rayleigh-Plesset ===
Building on the work of Lord Rayleigh, Plesset included the effects of viscosity, surface tension and a non-constant external pressure to the equation. This equation reads

$$R\ddot{R} +\frac{3}{2}\dot{R}^2 =\frac{p_i-p_\infty-\frac{2 \sigma}{R}- \frac{4\mu}{R}\dot{R}}{\rho_L}$$

=== Gilmore ===
The equation by Gilmore accounted for the compressibility of the liquid. In its derivation, the viscous term is only present as a product with the compressibility. This term is neglected. The resulting term is:

$$(1-\frac{\dot{R}(t)}{c(R)})R(t)\ddot{R}(t) +\frac{3}{2}(1-\frac{\dot{R}(t)}{3c(R)})\dot{R}^2(t) =(1+\frac{\dot{R}(t)}{c(R)})H(R)+(1-\frac{\dot{R}}{c(R)})\frac{R}{c(R)}\dot{H}(R)$$

In which:

$$H = \frac{n}{n-1}\frac{p_\infty(t)+B}{\rho_L}\left[ (\frac{P+B}{p_\infty(t) +B})^{\frac{n-1}{n}}-1\right]$$
$$c = c_0\left(\frac{p_{g}(t) -2\sigma /R+B}{p_\infty (t)+B}\right)^{\frac{n-1}{2n}}$$
$$\dot{H} = \frac{D}{p_{\infty}(t)+B} H-\frac{D}{\rho} (\frac{P+B}{p_{\infty}(t)+B}) ^ {\frac{n-1}{n}}+\frac{\dot{R}}{\rho_L R} \left[\frac{p_{\infty}(t)+B}{P+B}\right] ^{\frac{1}{n}} \left[\frac{2 \sigma}{R} -3k p_{g}(t)\right]$$

=== Others ===
Over the years, several other models have been developed by making different assumptions in the derivation of the Navier-Stokes equations.
