= Centrifugal pump =

Pump used to transport fluids by conversion of rotational kinetic energy

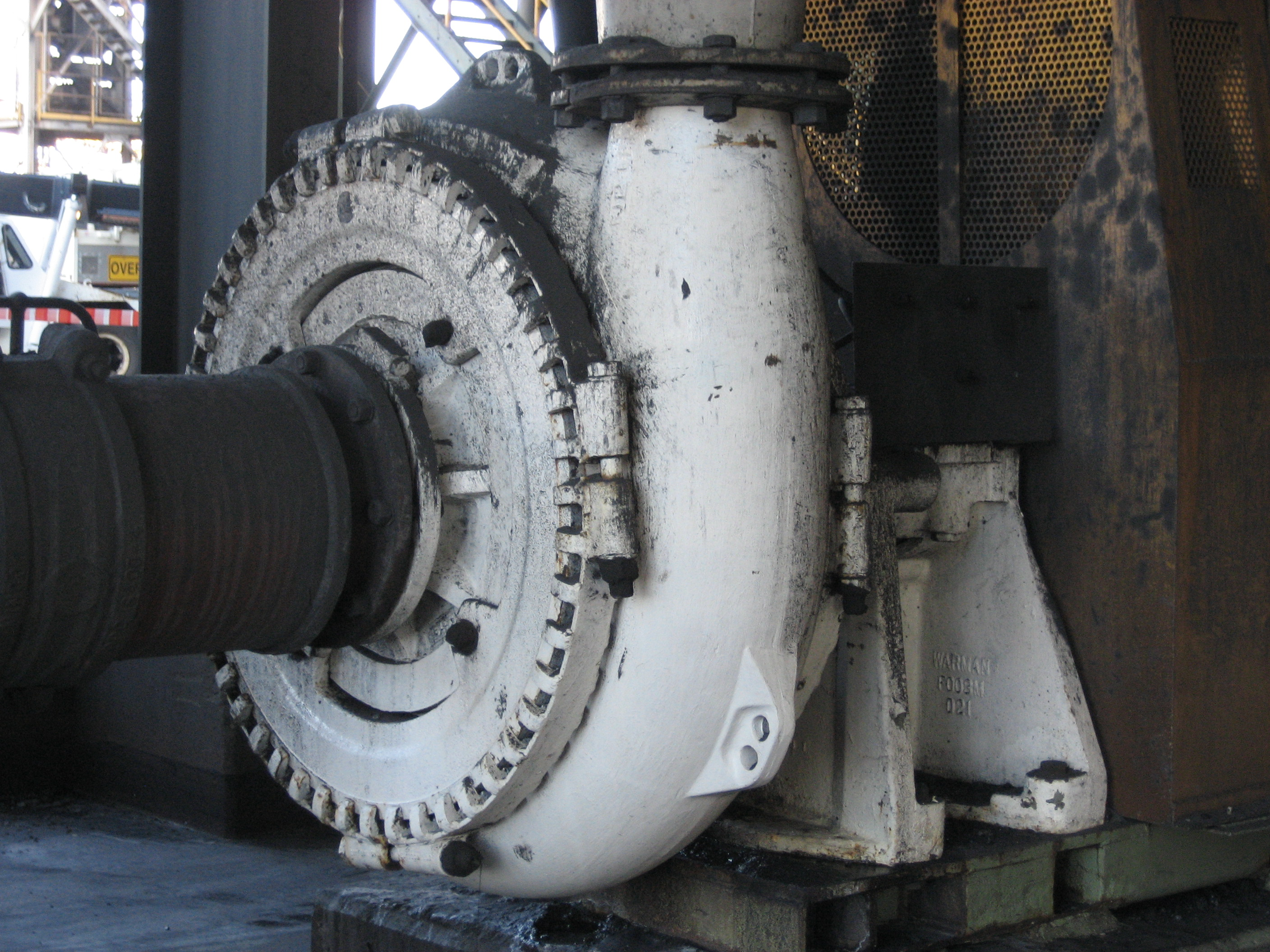
Warman centrifugal pump in a coal preparation plant application

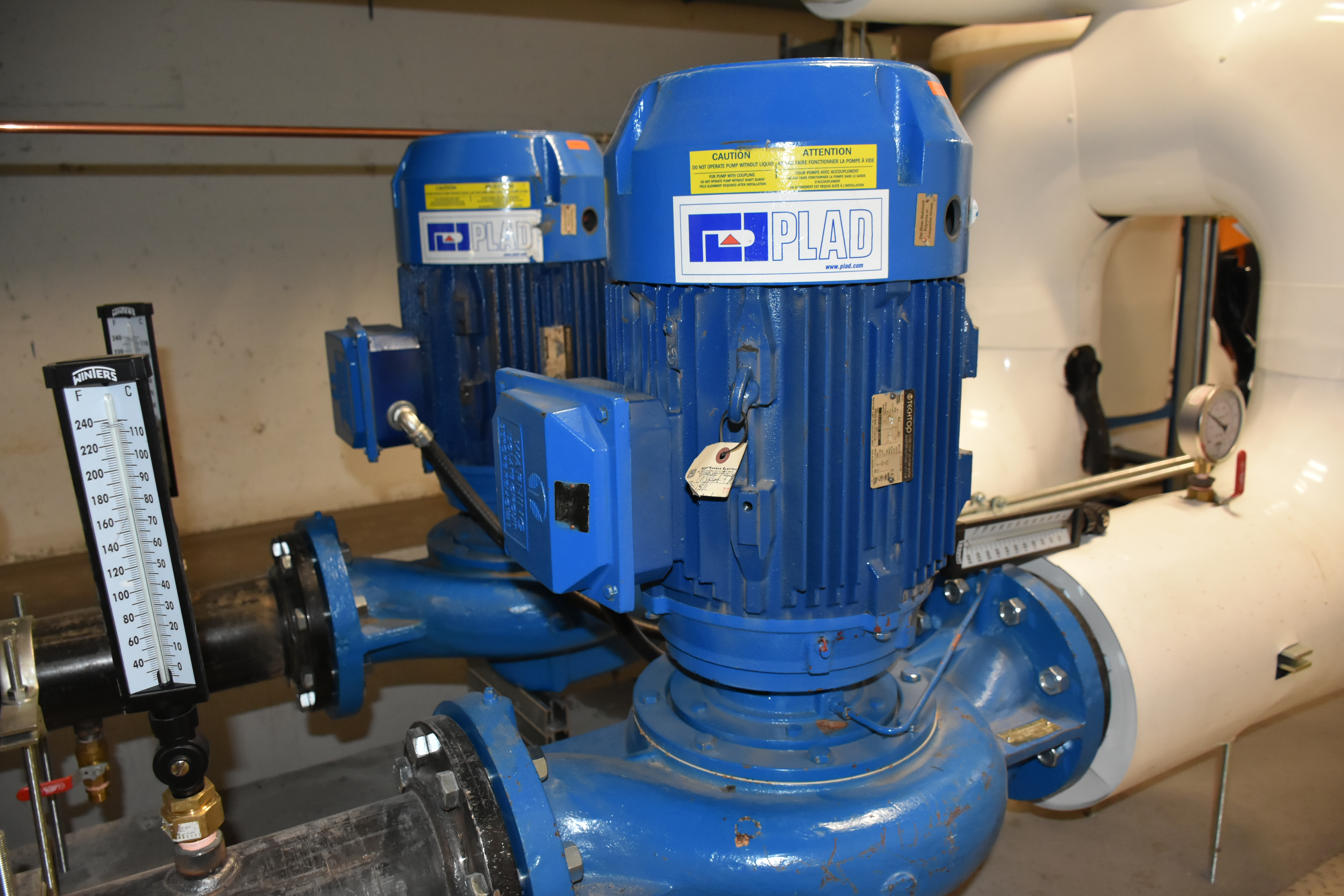
A pair of centrifugal pumps for circulating hot water within a hydronic heating system

Centrifugal pumps are used to transport fluids by the conversion of rotational kinetic energy to the hydrodynamic energy of the fluid flow. The rotational energy typically comes from an engine or electric motor. They are a sub-class of dynamic axisymmetric work-absorbing turbomachinery. The fluid enters the pump impeller along or near to the rotating axis and is accelerated by the impeller, flowing radially outward into a diffuser or volute chamber (casing), from which it exits.

Common uses include water, sewage, agriculture, petroleum, and petrochemical pumping. Centrifugal pumps are often chosen for their high flow rate capabilities, abrasive solution compatibility, mixing potential, as well as their relatively simple engineering. A centrifugal fan is commonly used to implement an air handling unit or vacuum cleaner. The reverse function of the centrifugal pump is a water turbine converting potential energy of water pressure into mechanical rotational energy.

== History ==
According to Reti, the first machine that could be characterized as a centrifugal pump was a mud lifting machine which appeared as early as 1475 in a treatise by the Italian Renaissance engineer Francesco di Giorgio Martini. True centrifugal pumps were not developed until the late 17th century, when Denis Papin built one using straight vanes. The curved vane was introduced by British inventor John Appold in 1851.

== Working principle ==
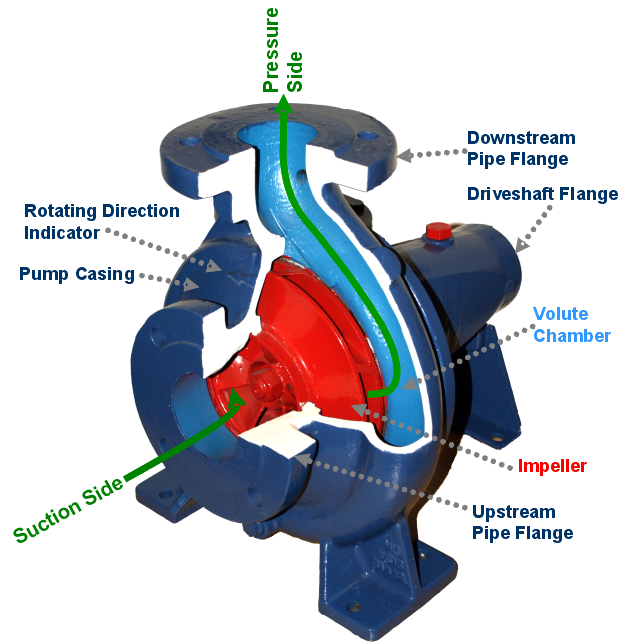
Cutaway view of centrifugal pump

Like most pumps, a centrifugal pump converts rotational energy, often from a motor, to energy in a moving fluid. A portion of the energy goes into kinetic energy of the fluid. Fluid enters axially through eye of the casing, is caught up in the impeller blades, and is whirled tangentially and radially outward until it leaves through all circumferential parts of the impeller into the diffuser part of the casing. The fluid gains both velocity and pressure while passing through the impeller. The doughnut-shaped diffuser, or scroll, section of the casing decelerates the flow and further increases the pressure.

=== Description by Euler ===
==== Euler's pump equation ====
A consequence of Newton's second law of mechanics is the conservation of the angular momentum (or the “moment of momentum”) which is of fundamental significance to all turbomachines. Accordingly, the change of the angular momentum is equal to the sum of the external moments. Therefore, the shaft torque is given by

$$\vec{T} = \rho Q(\vec{r}_2 \times \vec{V}_2 - \vec{r}_1 \times \vec{V}_1)$$

where:

- $\rho$ is the fluid density (kg/m^{3})
- $Q$ is the flow rate (m^{3}/s)
- $\vec{r}_1$ and $\vec{r}_2$ are the position vectors of the inlet and outlet respectively ($|\vec{r}|$ is the radius)
- $\vec{V}_1$ and $\vec{V}_2$ are the absolute velocity vectors of the fluid at the inlet and outlet respectively

The shaft power is given by

$$P_m = \vec{T} \cdot \vec{\omega} = \rho Q(\vec{V}_2 \cdot \vec{u}_2 - \vec{V}_1 \cdot \vec{u}_1)$$

where

- $\vec{\omega}$ is the angular velocity vector of the pump
- $\vec{u}_1 = \vec{\omega} \times \vec{r}_1$ and $\vec{u}_2 = \vec{\omega} \times \vec{r}_2$ are the blade circumferential velocity vectors at the inlet and outlet respectively

Euler developed the head rise equation created by the impeller as

$$H_t = \frac{P_m}{\rho gQ} = \frac{\vec{V}_2 \cdot \vec{u}_2 - \vec{V}_1 \cdot \vec{u}_1}{g} = \frac{(V_2^2-V_1^2)+(u_2^2-u_1^2)-(w_2^2-w_1^2)}{2g}$$

where

- $H_t$ is the theoretical head rise
- $g$ is the standard acceleration of gravity (9.80665 m/s^{2})
- $\vec{w} = \vec{V}-\vec{u}$ is the relative velocity vector

==== Velocity triangle ====
The triangle formed by velocity vectors $\vec{u},\vec{V},\vec{w}$ is called the velocity triangle.

=== Efficiency factor ===
Since the power delivered to the fluid is $\rho gQH$, the efficiency factor is given by

$$\eta = \frac{\rho gQH}{P_m}$$

where:

- $P_m$ is the mechanics input power required (in watts)
- $\rho$ is the fluid density (kg/m^{3})
- $g$ is the standard acceleration of gravity (9.80665 m/s^{2})
- $H$ is the energy head added to the flow (in metres)
- $Q$ is the flow rate (in m^{3}/s)
- $\eta$ is the efficiency of the pump plant as a decimal

The head added by the pump ($H$) is a sum of the static lift, the head loss due to friction and any losses due to valves or pipe bends are all expressed in metres of fluid. Power is more commonly expressed as kilowatts (10^{3} W, kW) or horsepower. The value for the pump efficiency, $\eta_{\textrm{pump}}$, may be stated for the pump itself or as a combined efficiency of the pump and motor system.

== Vertical centrifugal pumps ==
Vertical centrifugal pumps are also referred to as cantilever pumps. They utilize a unique shaft and bearing support configuration that allows the volute to hang in the sump while the bearings are outside the sump. This style of pump uses no stuffing box to seal the shaft but instead utilizes a "throttle bushing". A common application for this style of pump is in a parts washer.

== Froth pumps ==
In the mineral industry, or in the extraction of oilsand, froth is generated to separate the rich minerals or bitumen from the sand and clays. Froth contains air that tends to block conventional pumps and cause loss of prime. Over history, industry has developed different ways to deal with this problem. In the pulp and paper industry holes are drilled in the impeller. Air escapes to the back of the impeller and a special expeller discharges the air back to the suction tank. The impeller may also feature special small vanes between the primary vanes called split vanes or secondary vanes. Some pumps may feature a large eye, an inducer or recirculation of pressurized froth from the pump discharge back to the suction to break the bubbles.

== Multistage centrifugal pumps ==
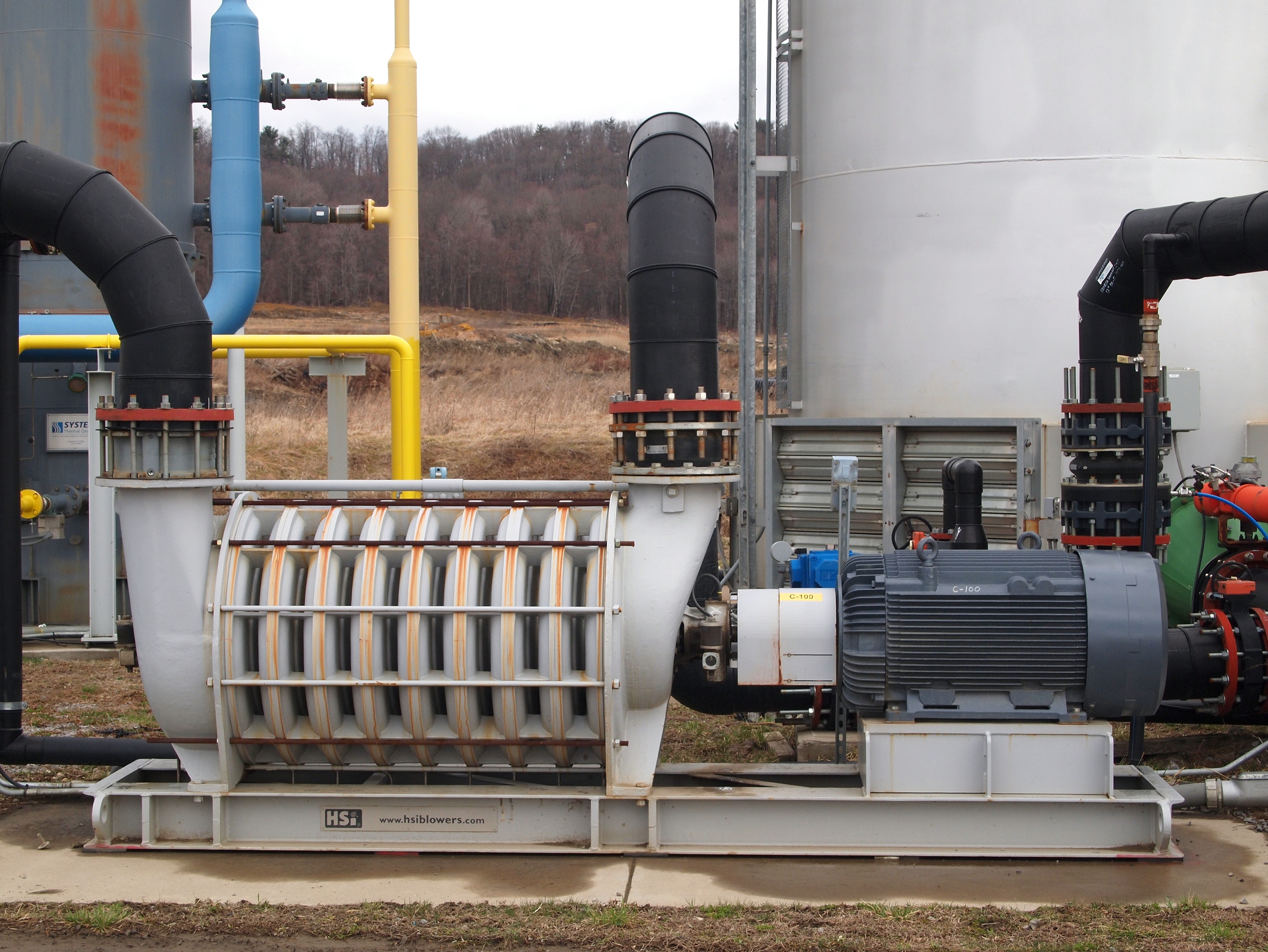
Multistage centrifugal blower

A centrifugal pump containing two or more impellers is called a multistage centrifugal pump. The impellers may be mounted on the same shaft or on different shafts. At each stage, the fluid is directed to the center before making its way to the discharge on the outer diameter.

For higher pressures at the outlet, impellers can be connected in series. For higher flow output, impellers can be connected in parallel.

A common application of the multistage centrifugal pump is the boiler feedwater pump. For example, a 350 MW unit would require two feedpumps in parallel. Each feedpump is a multistage centrifugal pump producing 150 L/s at 21 MPa.

All energy transferred to the fluid is derived from the mechanical energy driving the impeller. This can be measured at isentropic compression, resulting in a slight temperature increase (in addition to the pressure increase).

== Energy usage ==
The energy usage in a pumping installation is determined by the flow required, the height lifted and the length and friction characteristics of the pipeline. The power required to drive a pump ($P_i$) is defined simply using SI units by:

Single-stage radial-flow centrifugal pump

$$P_i= \cfrac{\rho\ g\ H\ Q}{\eta}$$

where:

- $P_i$ is the input power required (in watts)
- $\rho$ is the fluid density (in kilograms per cubic metre, kg/m^{3})
- $g$ is the standard acceleration of gravity (9.80665 m/s^{2})
- $H$ is the energy Head added to the flow (in metres)
- $Q$ is the volumetric flow rate (in cubic metres per second, m^{3}/s)
- $\eta$ is the efficiency of the pump plant as a decimal

The head added by the pump ($H$) is a sum of the static lift, the head loss due to friction and any losses due to valves or pipe bends all expressed in metres of fluid. Power is more commonly expressed as kilowatts (10^{3} W, kW) or horsepower (1 hp = 0.746 kW). The value for the pump efficiency, $\eta_{pump}$, may be stated for the pump itself or as a combined efficiency of the pump and motor system.

The energy usage is determined by multiplying the power requirement by the length of time the pump is operating.

== Problems of centrifugal pumps ==
These are some difficulties faced in centrifugal pumps:

- Cavitation—the net positive suction head (NPSH) of the system is too low for the selected pump
- Wear of the impeller—can be worsened by suspended solids or cavitation
- Corrosion inside the pump caused by the fluid properties
- Overheating due to low flow
- Leakage along rotating shaft.
- Lack of prime—centrifugal pumps must be filled (with the fluid to be pumped) in order to operate
- Surge
- Viscous liquids may reduce efficiency
- Other pump types may be more suitable for high pressure applications
- Large solids or debris may clog the pump

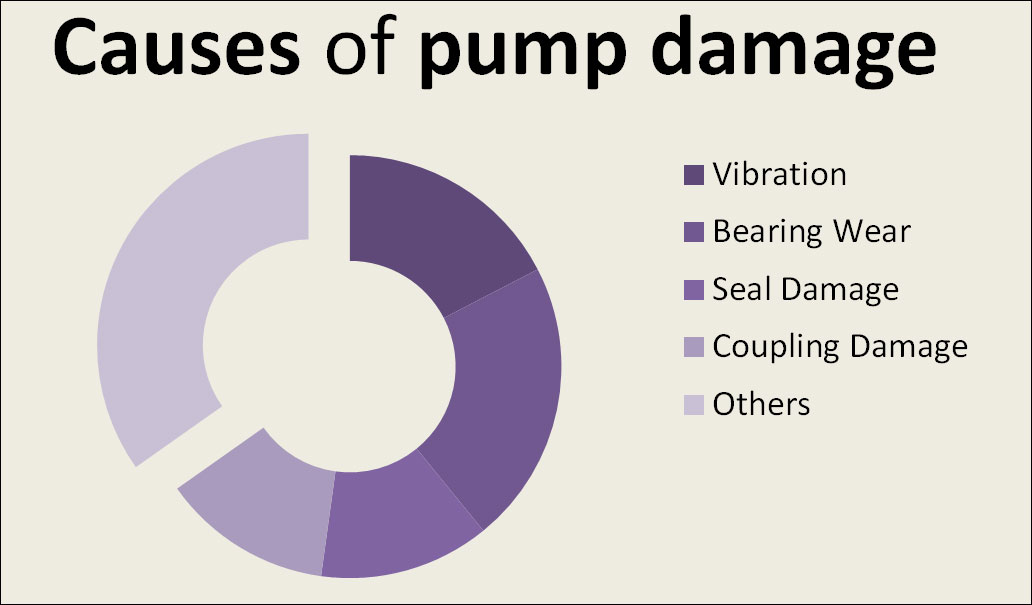
Pie chart showing what causes damage to pumps

== Centrifugal pumps for solids control ==
An oilfield solids control system needs many centrifugal pumps to sit on or in mud tanks. The types of centrifugal pumps used are sand pumps, submersible slurry pumps, shear pumps, and charging pumps. They are defined for their different functions, but their working principle is the same.

Centrifugal pumps are also widely used in industrial operations such as chemical processing, pharmaceuticals, food manufacturing, water treatment, and boiler feed applications. Their ability to handle large flow rates with relatively low maintenance makes them suitable for continuous-duty environments.

== Magnetically coupled pumps ==
Magnetically coupled pumps, magnetic drive, sealless or canned pumps, vary from the traditional pumping style, as the motor is coupled to the pump by magnetic means rather than by a direct mechanical shaft. The pump works via a drive magnet, 'driving' the pump rotor, which is magnetically coupled to the primary shaft driven by the motor, or the motor rotor sits inside the pump's working fluid while the stator sits outside, separated by a metal cylinder or "can". They are often used where leakage of the fluid pumped poses a great risk (e.g., aggressive fluid in the chemical or nuclear industry, or electric shock - garden fountains). Other use cases include when corrosive, combustible, or toxic fluids must be pumped (e.g., hydrochloric acid, sodium hydroxide, sodium hypochlorite, sulfuric acid, ferric/ferrous chloride or nitric acid). They have no direct connection between the motor shaft and the impeller, or all moving parts are in the working fluid so no stuffing box or gland is needed. There is no risk of leakage, unless the casing is broken. Since the pump shaft is not supported by bearings outside the pump's housing, support inside the pump is provided by bushings. The pump size of a magnetic drive pumps can go from few watts of power to a giant 1 MW.

== Priming ==
The process of filling the pump with liquid is called priming. All centrifugal pumps require liquid in the liquid casing to prime. If the pump casing becomes filled with vapors or gases, the pump impeller becomes gas-bound and incapable of pumping. To ensure that a centrifugal pump remains primed and does not become gas-bound, most centrifugal pumps are located below the level of the source from which the pump is to take its suction. The same effect can be gained by supplying liquid to the pump suction under pressure supplied by another pump placed in the suction line.

=== Self-priming centrifugal pump ===
In normal conditions, common centrifugal pumps are unable to evacuate the air from an inlet line leading to a fluid level whose geodetic altitude is below that of the pump. Self-priming pumps have to be capable of evacuating air from the pump suction line without any external auxiliary devices.

Centrifugal pumps with an internal suction stage such as water-jet pumps or side-channel pumps are also classified as self-priming pumps. Self-Priming centrifugal pumps were invented in 1935. One of the first companies to market a self-priming centrifugal pump was American Marsh in 1938.

Centrifugal pumps that are not designed with an internal or external self-priming stage can only start to pump the fluid after the pump has initially been primed with the fluid. Sturdier but slower, their impellers are designed to move liquid, which is far denser than air, leaving them unable to operate when air is present. In addition, a suction-side swing check valve or a vent valve must be fitted to prevent any siphon action and ensure that the fluid remains in the casing when the pump has been stopped. In self-priming centrifugal pumps with a separation chamber the fluid pumped and the entrained air bubbles are pumped into the separation chamber by the impeller action.

The air escapes through the pump discharge nozzle whilst the fluid drops back down and is once more entrained by the impeller. The suction line is thus continuously evacuated. The design required for such a self-priming feature has an adverse effect on pump efficiency. Also, the dimensions of the separating chamber are relatively large. For these reasons this solution is only adopted for small pumps, e.g. garden pumps. More frequently used types of self-priming pumps are side-channel and water-ring pumps.

Another type of self-priming pump is a centrifugal pump with two casing chambers and an open impeller. This design is not only used for its self-priming capabilities but also for its degassing effects when pumping two-phase mixtures (air/gas and liquid) for a short time in process engineering or when handling polluted fluids, for example, when draining water from construction pits. This pump type operates without a foot valve and without an evacuation device on the suction side. The pump has to be primed with the fluid to be handled prior to commissioning. Two-phase mixture is pumped until the suction line has been evacuated and the fluid level has been pushed into the front suction intake chamber by atmospheric pressure. During normal pumping operation this pump works like an ordinary centrifugal pump.

=== Classification of Centrifugal Pumps ===
Centrifugal pumps are divided into many types according to different structural characteristics.

- According to the number of working impeller: there are single stage pumps and multistage pumps;
- According to the working pressure: there are low pressure pumps, medium pressure pumps, high pressure pumps;
- According to the suction type: there are single suction pumps and double suction pump;
- According to the pump casing joint form: there are horizontal split casing pumps and vertical joint pumps;
- According to the discharge type: there are volute pumps and guide vane pumps.

For example, we sometimes say one pump belongs to a multistage pump according to the impeller stage number, then observe its structural characteristics, and it may be horizontal pump, or vertical combined surface pump, or guide vane pump, or high pressure pump, or single-side water pump, etc.

- According to the different position of the pump shaft: there are horizontal pumps and vertical pumps. Horizontal centrifugal pump are the most widely used in petrochemical industry.
- Horizontal centrifugal pumps according to the pump casing split form: there are radial split horizontal centrifugal pumps and axial split horizontal centrifugal pumps
- According to the number of pump casing: there are single casing pumps and double casing pumps(cylinder type);
- According to the bearing support type: there are cantilever centrifugal pumps and between-bearings centrifugal pumps.

Many different impeller types can be used in a centrifugal pump, such as open, semi open or semi (en)closed, (en)closed, vortex, mixed flow, straight vane and curved vane. An enclosed screw impeller in a centrifugal pump has low shear force through the fluid and is this used for pumping live fish in water and highly abrasive slurries without damage to the fish or pump. An open version can be used to pump suspended grains or foods such as barley. An anti clog vane can be placed at the suction opening of the pump housing to prevent tangling caused by long flexible objects such as hair.

== See also ==
- Centrifugal compressor
- Axial flow pump
- Net positive suction head (NPSH)
- Pump
- Roots blower
- Seal (mechanical)
- Specific speed (N_{s} or N_{ss})
- Thermodynamic pump testing
- Turbine
- Turbopump

== Sources ==
- ASME B73 Standards Committee, Chemical Standard Pumps
- Centrifugal fan and pump
- Inlet-opening or eye of centrifugal fans or pumps
- Centrifugal fan or pump
- Centrifugal fan or pump and casing therefor
