= CUSA =

CUSA may refer to:

- Kues, town in Germany
  - Nicholas of Cusa (1401–1464), German philosopher, theologian, jurist, and astronomer
- Carleton University Students' Association, Carleton University in Ottawa, Ontario, Canada
- Colleges and Universities Sports Association, a collegiate athletic conference in the Philippines
- Conference USA, a collegiate athletic conference in the United States
- Council of Unions of South Africa, a former South African trade union federation
- Canada and the United States; see List of country groupings § C
- Cavitron Ultrasonic Surgical Aspirator
