= Specific speed =

Measure of turbomachinery speed

Specific speed N_{s}, is used to characterize turbomachinery speed. Common commercial and industrial practices use dimensioned versions which are of equal utility. Specific speed is most commonly used in pump applications to define the suction specific speed —a quasi non-dimensional number that categorizes pump impellers as to their type and proportions. In Imperial units it is defined as the speed in revolutions per minute at which a geometrically similar impeller would operate if it were of such a size as to deliver one gallon per minute against one foot of hydraulic head. In metric units flow may be in l/s or m^{3}/s and head in m, and care must be taken to state the units used.

Performance is defined as the ratio of the pump or turbine against a reference pump or turbine, which divides the actual performance figure to provide a unitless figure of merit. The resulting figure would more descriptively be called the "ideal-reference-device-specific performance." This resulting unitless ratio may loosely be expressed as a "speed," only because the performance of the reference ideal pump is linearly dependent on its speed, so that the ratio of [device-performance to reference-device-performance] is also the increased speed at which the reference device would need to operate, in order to produce the performance, instead of its reference speed of "1 unit."

Specific speed is an index used to predict desired pump or turbine performance. i.e. it predicts the general shape of a pump's impeller. It is this impeller's "shape" that predicts its flow and head characteristics so that the designer can then select a pump or turbine most appropriate for a particular application. Once the desired specific speed is known, basic dimensions of the unit's components can be easily calculated.

Several mathematical definitions of specific speed (all of them actually ideal-device-specific) have been created for different devices and applications.

== Pump specific speed ==
Low-specific speed radial flow impellers develop hydraulic head principally through centrifugal force. Pumps of higher specific speeds develop head partly by centrifugal force and partly by axial force. An axial flow or propeller pump with a specific speed of 10,000 or greater generates its head exclusively through axial forces. Radial impellers are generally low flow/high head designs whereas axial flow impellers are high flow/low head designs. In theory, the discharge of a "purely" centrifugal machine (pump, turbine, fan, etc.) is tangential to the rotation of the impeller whereas a "purely" axial-flow machine's discharge will be parallel to the axis of rotation. There are also machines that exhibit a combination of both properties and are specifically referred to as "mixed-flow" machines.

Centrifugal pump impellers have specific speed values ranging from 500 to 10,000 (English units), with radial flow pumps at 500 to 4,000, mixed flow at 2,000 to 8,000, and axial flow pumps at 7,000 to 20,000. Values of specific speed less than 500 are associated with positive displacement pumps.

As the specific speed increases, the ratio of the impeller outlet diameter to the inlet or eye diameter decreases. This ratio becomes 1.0 for a true axial flow impeller.

The following equation gives a dimensionless specific speed:

$N_s = \frac { n \sqrt Q } { (gH)^{ 3/4 } }$

where:

$N_s$ is specific speed (dimensionless)
$n$ is pump rotational speed (rad/sec)
$Q$ is flowrate (m^{3}/s) at the point of best efficiency
$H$ is total head (m) per stage at the point of best efficiency

Note that the units used affect the specific speed value in the above equation and consistent units should be used for comparisons. Pump specific speed can be calculated using British gallons or using Metric units (m^{3}/s and metres head), changing the values listed above.

== Suction specific speed ==
The suction specific speed is mainly used to see if there will be problems with cavitation during the pump's operation on the suction side. It is defined by centrifugal and axial pumps' inherent physical characteristics and operating point. The suction specific speed of a pump will define the range of operation in which a pump will experience stable operation. The higher the suction specific speed, then the smaller the range of stable operation, up to the point of cavitation at 8500 (unitless). The envelope of stable operation is defined in terms of the best efficiency point of the pump.

The suction specific speed is defined as:

$N_{ss} = \frac{n\sqrt{Q}} {{NPSH}_R^{0.75}}$

where:

$N_{ss} =$suction specific speed
$n =$rotational speed of pump in rpm
$Q =$flow of pump in US gallons per minute
${NPSH}_R =$ Net positive suction head (NPSH) required in feet at pump's best efficiency point

== Turbine specific speed ==
The specific speed value for a turbine is the speed of a geometrically similar turbine which would produce unit power (one kilowatt) under unit head (one meter). The specific speed of a turbine is given by the manufacturer (along with other ratings) and will always refer to the point of maximum efficiency. This allows accurate calculations to be made of the turbine's performance for a range of heads.

Well-designed efficient machines typically use the following values: Impulse turbines have the lowest n_{s} values, typically ranging from 1 to 10, a Pelton wheel is typically around 4, Francis turbines fall in the range of 10 to 100, while Kaplan turbines are at least 100 or more, all in imperial units.

=== Deriving the Turbine Specific Speed ===
To derive the Turbine specific speed equation we first start with the Power formula for water then using proportionalities with η,ρ, and g being constant they can be removed. The power of the turbine is therefore only dependent on the head H and flow Q.

$$P=\eta \rho gQH$$
so $P \propto QH$

let:

$D$ = Diameter of the turbine runner
$B$ = Width of the turbine runner
$N$ = Speed of the turbine (rpm)
$u$ = Tangential velocity of the turbine blade (m/s)
$N_s$ = Specific Speed of the Turbine
$V$ = Velocity of water at turbine (m/s)

Now utilising the constant speed ratio at the turbine tip, the following proportionality can be made that the tangential velocity of the turbine blade is proportional to the square root of the head.

$$V = \sqrt{2gH}$$
Speed ratio $= \frac{u}{V} = \frac{u}{\sqrt{2gH}}$
so $u \propto \sqrt{H}$

But from rotational speed in RPM to linear speed in m/s the following equation and proportionality can be made.

$$u = \frac{\pi DN}{60}$$
so $D \propto \frac{u}{N}$

The flow through a turbine is the product of flow velocity and area so the flow through a turbine can be quantified.

$$Q = \pi DBV_{flow}$$
with $B \propto D$

and as shown previously:

$$V_{flow} \propto V \propto \sqrt{2gH} \propto \sqrt{H}$$

So using the above 2, the following is obtained

$$Q \propto D^2\sqrt{H}$$

By combining the equation for diameter and tangential speed, with tangential speed and head a relationship between flow and head can be reached.

$$Q \propto \left ( \frac{\sqrt{H}}{N} \right )^2 \sqrt{H} \therefore Q \propto \frac{H^{3/2}}{N^2}$$

Substituting this back into the power equation gives:

$$P \propto \frac{H^{3/2}}{N^2} H \therefore P \propto \frac{H^{5/2}}{N^2}$$

To convert this proportionality into an equation a factor of proportionality, say K, must be introduced which gives:

$$P = K \frac{H^{5/2}}{N^2}$$

Now assuming our original proposition of producing 1 kilowatt at 1m head our speed N becomes our specific speed $N_s$. So substituting these values into our equation gives:

$$1 = K \frac{1^{5/2}}{{N_s}^2} \therefore K = {N_s}^2$$

Now we know $K$ we have a complete formula for specific speed,$N_s$:

$$P = {N_s}^2 \frac{H^{5/2}}{N^2}$$

So rearranging for Specific Speed give the final following result:

$N_s=\frac{N\sqrt{P}}{H^{5/4}}$

where:

- $N$ = Wheel speed (rpm)
- $P$ = Power (kW)
- $H$ = Water head (m)

=== English units ===
Expressed in English units, the "specific speed" is defined as n_{s} = n √P/h^{5/4}

- where n is the wheel speed in rpm
- P is the power in horsepower
- h is the water head in feet

=== Metric units ===
Expressed in metric units, the "specific speed" is n_{s} = 0.2626 n √P/h^{5/4}

- where n is the wheel speed in rpm
- P is the power in kilowatts
- h is the water head in meters

The factor 0.2626 is only required when the specific speed is to be adjusted to English units. In countries which use the metric system, the factor is omitted, and quoted specific speeds are correspondingly larger.

=== Example ===
Given a flow and head for a specific hydro site, and the RPM requirement of the generator, calculate the specific speed. The result is the main criteria for turbine selection or the starting point for analytical design of a new turbine. Once the desired specific speed is known, basic dimensions of the turbine parts can be easily calculated.

Turbine calculations:

$$N_s=\frac{2.294}{H_n^{0.486}}$$

$$D_e=84.5(0.79+1.602 N_s) \frac{\sqrt{H_n}}{60 * \Omega}$$

$D_e$ = Runner diameter (m)

== See also ==
- Pump
- Net positive suction head
- Water turbine
