= International Journal of Multiphase Flow =

- Discipline: Fluid mechanics
- Language: English
- Edited by: Alfredo Soldati and S. Balachander

Publication details
- History: 1973–present
- Publisher: Elsevier
- Frequency: Monthly
- Impact factor: 3.186 (2020)

Standard abbreviations
- ISO 4: Int. J. Multiph. Flow

Indexing
- CODEN: IJMFBP
- ISSN: 0301-9322
- LCCN: 74642847
- OCLC no.: 31158553

Links
- Journal homepage; Online access

The International Journal of Multiphase Flow is a monthly peer-reviewed scientific journal covering fluid mechanics. The editors-in-chief are Alfredo Soldati (TU Wien) and S. Balachander (U Florida). The founding editor was Gad Hetsroni (Technion – Israel Institute of Technology). Previous editor (2007-2017) was Andrea Prosperetti (U Houston).

According to the Journal Citation Reports, the journal has a 2020 impact factor of 3.186.
