= Thermodynamic pump testing =

Method of pump testing

Thermodynamic pump testing is a form of pump testing where only the temperature rise, power consumed, and differential pressure need to be measured to find the efficiency of a pump. These measurements are typically made with insertion temperature probes and pressure probes fitted to tapping points on the pump's inlet and outlet. From these measurements, the flow produced by a pump can be derived. The thermodynamic method was developed in the early 1960s, and since has been increasingly used. It is described in high precision hydraulic testing standards such as ISO 5198.

The thermodynamic method is used for performance testing of pumps, flow meter calibration, system curve tests, and other applications. It is capable of achieving results with uncertainties of less than 1% in pump efficiency and less than 1.5% in flow while being able to test piping configurations where other conventional pump testing methods cannot provide accurate results.

== History ==
The thermodynamic method was developed concurrently in the 1960s at the University of Glasgow and University of Strathclyde in Scotland, and the National Engineering Laboratory in France (Electricite de France) and Austin Whillier (Chamber of Mines, Johannesburg, South Africa). Whillier published a paper titled "Pump efficiency determination from temperature measurements" in the October 1967 edition of The South African Mechanical Engineer describing the method.

Since that time, the thermodynamic method has been rigorously verified in many instances by different companies, including:

- Water Research Centre (UK)
- National Engineering Laboratories (UK)
- Central Electricity Generating Board (UK)
- University of Exeter (UK)
- Damstadt University (Germany)
- ATAP - Yatesmeter (Canada)
- Hydratek & Associates Inc. (Canada)
- Flowserve
- Sulzer
- Weir
- Ebara
- KSB
- SPP
- Riventa

The thermodynamic pump testing method is now included in pump testing standards such as the BS ISO 5198: Centrifugal, mixed flow and axial pumps - Code for hydraulic performance tests - Precision Class.

== Method and equipment ==
The inefficiency of pumps is transmitted through the medium of temperature. Thus, nearly all of the energy lost due to the inefficiency of a pump causes an increase in temperature of the fluid which is being pumped. The thermodynamic method takes advantage of this fact, and precisely measures the temperature difference across a pump to calculate the pump's efficiency. Pressure measurements are used to calculate the head of the pump, and a power meter is used to measure input power to the pump. Using the measurements of temperature, power, and pressure, flow can be back-calculated using the pump equation.

The temperature measurement is critical, and consequently commercial distributors of thermodynamic pump testing equipment often quote an accuracy of greater than 0.001 °C. Such accuracy is necessary as the temperature rise across a pump may be less than 0.05 °C. Typically, temperature probes are inserted directly into the flow, and pressure measurements are taken from taps on both the suction and discharge sections of the pipe. Then, the head on the pump is varied by some sort of adjustment such as throttling a discharge valve, utilizing different pump combinations in parallel, or adjusting well levels. This allows the pump's performance to be tested across its range of operation as its head, and hence flow, is varied.

== Thermodynamic method vs. conventional method ==
=== Measured and calculated quantities ===
The conventional pump testing method is a method which relies on flow measurements rather than temperature measurements to obtain the performance curves of pumps. Hence, the thermodynamic method differs from the conventional pump testing method largely in what is measured, and how those values are calculated. The table below shows which parameters are measured by the test equipment, and which are calculated.

Method	Head	Flow	Efficiency	Power
Thermodynamic Method	measured	calculated	measured	measured
Conventional Method	measured	measured	calculated	measured

As seen in the table above, the main difference between the two methods is that the conventional method calculates efficiency and measures the other variables directly, while the thermodynamic method calculates flow and measures the other variables directly. Because of this, the accuracy of the calculated efficiency in the conventional method hinges upon the accuracy of the head, flow, and power measurements. Similarly, in the thermodynamic method, the accuracy of the calculated flow is dependent on the accuracy of the head, efficiency, and power measurements.

=== Testing requirements ===
Another key difference between the two methods is test setup requirements. The conventional method requires more stringent piping requirements, usually requiring greater than 5 diameters of straight pipe upstream of the flow meter in order to provide the quoted flow accuracy. The thermodynamic method, however, typically requires only 1-2 diameters of straight pipe upstream of the equipment in order to achieve quoted accuracies. Consequently, the thermodynamic method is often able to perform field tests which cannot be performed by a conventional test.

== Applications ==
The thermodynamic method is used to test water, wastewater, and other pumps, but because of its ability to accurately test flow, it is also used for applications such as system curve testing, flow meter verification and calibration, and perpetual efficiency monitoring. This method is useful particularly in situations which do not have the piping requirements of conventional testing methods. It can, like conventional pump testing, be used to gauge the performance of pumps for preventative maintenance and to inform replacement and refurbishment decisions. Additionally, the method can be extended to blower and turbine performance testing.

== Notable projects utilizing the thermodynamic method ==
A number of projects have utilized the thermodynamic method for large scale pump testing and performance review. A few projects are listed below.

=== Melbourne (UK) real time pump and turbine network optimisation ===
A project between the Riventa and the UK's Severn Trent Water (STW) at the water company's Melbourne Area Network, which has always suffered from large variations in energy use. Numerous historic investigations had not uncovered the reasons or best operating policies. The complex algorithms developed as part of the work enabled STW to accurately schedule operation over a set horizon, meeting the demand with very appreciable energy cost reductions - a process simply too difficult for operational staff to do by experience alone. Two key technologies were amalgamated to provide a network optimisation methodology: thermodynamic pump performance measurement for individual pump and station efficiency analysis, and live hydraulic modelling to assess network routes and their hydraulic profiles.

=== Ontario pump efficiency assessment and awareness pilot study (Canada) ===
This project was sponsored by the Ontario Power Authority to test over 150 water pumps in Ontario, Canada, across eight geographically diverse municipalities. The thermodynamic pump testing method was utilized, along with a number of conventional tests performed alongside the thermodynamic method to demonstrate the effectiveness of the thermodynamic method. The project tested a variety of pumps ranging from 30 to 4000 HP and was completed in May 2013.

=== Pump efficiency monitoring and managementement at Melbourne Water (Australia) ===
In an effort to minimize energy costs and associated greenhouse gas emissions, Melbourne Water in Australia applied thermodynamic pump testing to monitor pumps at four major pumping stations. Over the course of 2003 and 2004, 23 water and wastewater pumps were tested as part of this project.

== See also ==
- Axial Pump
- Centrifugal Fan
- Centrifugal Pump
- Flow Measurement
- Pump
- Turbine
- Wastewater
- Water Supply
