= American Marsh =

Self priming centrifugal pump company

- Industry: Centrifugal pumps
- Founded: c. 1873
- Headquarters: United States
- Area served: United States
- Products: Centrifugal pumps, fire protection pumps
- Website: american-marsh.com

American-Marsh Pumps is a company that makes self-priming centrifugal pumps. It was originally called American Steam Pump Co., as they started out making steam pumps. They were the first company to market a centrifugal pump, and briefly forayed into making corliss-valved air compressors. The company focuses on the Industrial, Municipal, Commercial and Fire Protection markets. They also make irrigation pumps and pumps for fracking.

== History ==
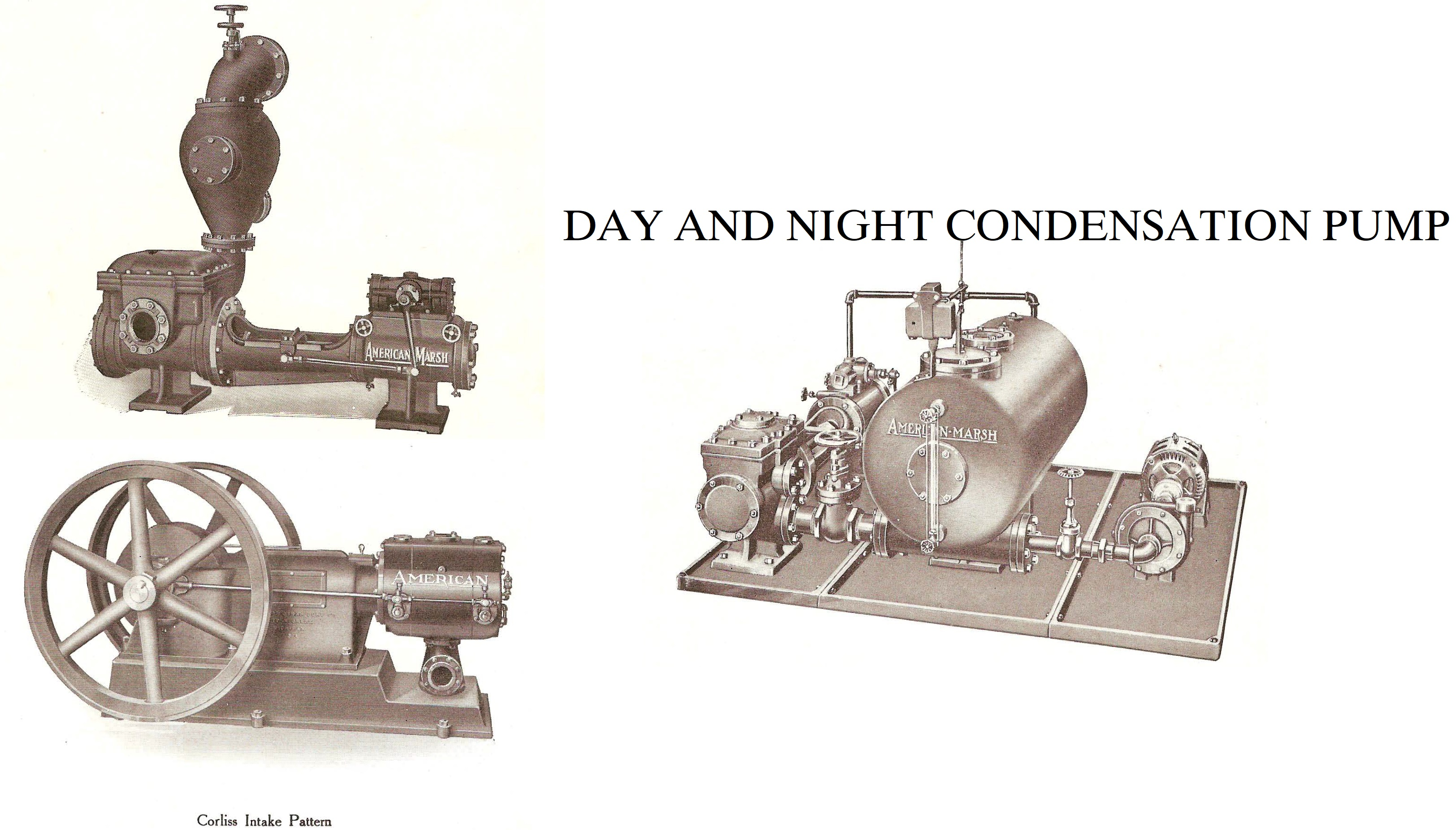
Two steam powered water pumps and an air compressor pre-1915

The "Marsh" portion of the company name came from Elon Marsh, an engineer at the company. In the 1930s they manufactured the TURBO pump. Today the largest pump they market is the 480 Vertical turbine pump. The company is considered a major pump manufacturer and key pump design developer. The company is owned by, but retains separate identity from, J-Line Pump. From 1975 to 1999, J-Line was located near Memphis International Airport, and in 2013 bought a new location for $1.4 million.
