= Solutions for cavitation in marine propellers =

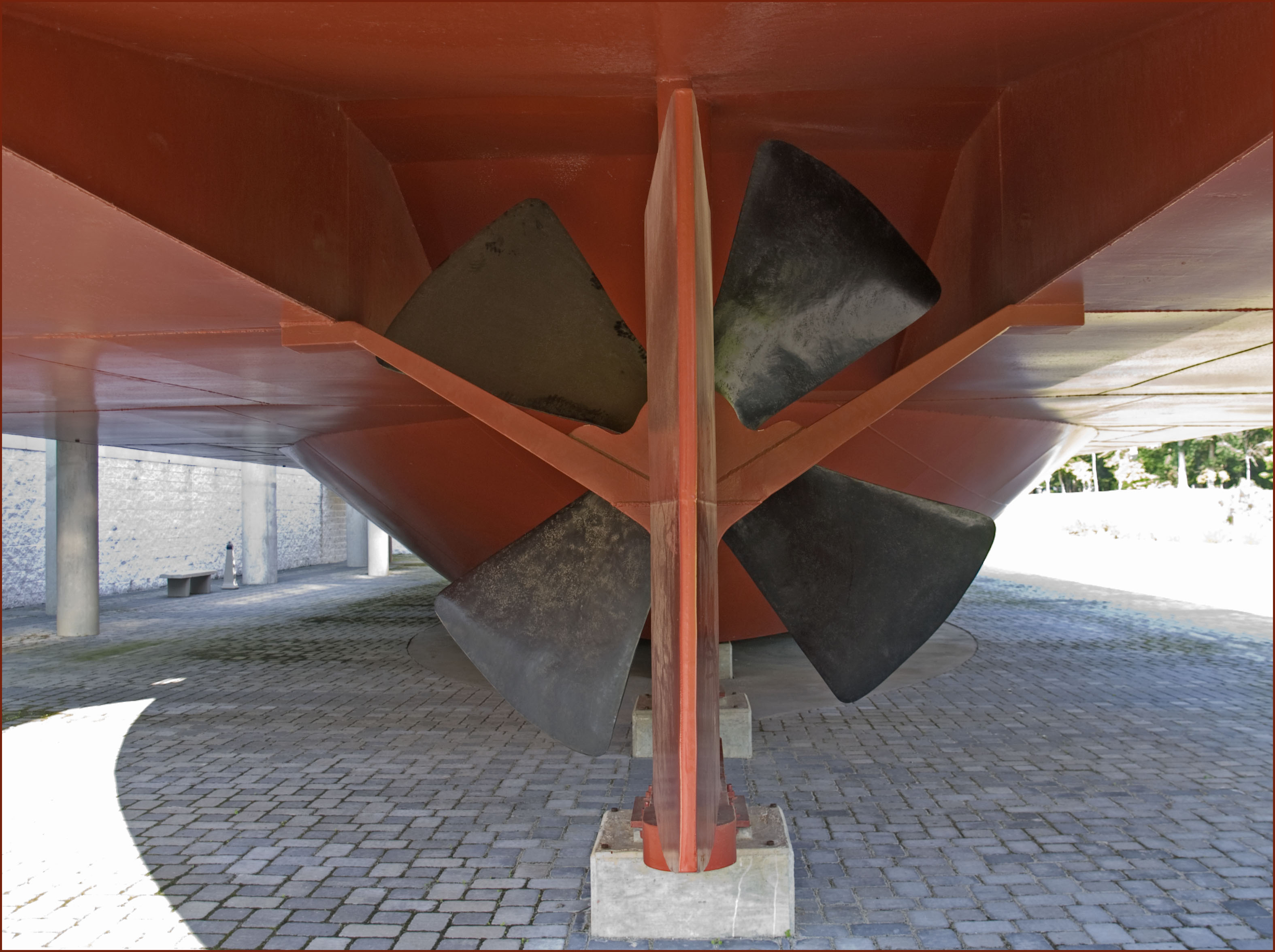
Replica of a propeller from the USS Monitor

Since the introduction of the marine propeller in the early 19th century, cavitation during operation has been a limiting factor in the efficiency of ships. Cavitation in marine propellers develops when the propeller operates at a high speed and reduces the efficiency of the propeller. Ever since the introduction of the propeller, solutions for cavitation have been developed and tested.

== Nozzle noise reduction system ==
A nozzle system uses a set of nozzles to help reduce the vibrations on the hull due to cavitation. This system was developed by Samsung Heavy Industries, based in South Korea. In order to reduce the hull vibrations caused by cavitation, a set of nozzles are placed on the hull of the ship directly in front of the propeller. These nozzles spray out compressed air above the propeller that creates "a macro bubble". This bubble protects the hull by absorbing pressure excitations produced by cavitation.

To determine the effectiveness of this nozzle system, multiple tests have been carried out with the nozzles and without them. In these tests, it was discovered that the resonance frequencies and vibration could be reduced by up to 75%. Those who conducted these tests also tried two different arrangements of the nozzles to find out which one was more effective. The first arrangement used only one nozzle, and though it used considerably less power than the other option, it was less effective at reducing hull vibration. The multi-nozzle system, however, performed significantly better, but required more power to operate.

While this nozzle system has major drawbacks, particularly in its power requirements, the vibrations and noise are reduced considerably. Thus, to some ship owners and operators, the cost of installing these nozzles and operating them is outweighed by the benefits of reduced noise caused by their propellers.

== Air-filled rubber membrane ==
The air-filled rubber membrane uses the same principles as the nozzle system to reduce cavitation in marine propellers. As the nozzle system requires a large source of energy to operate, the creators sought to develop a lower cost system. This membrane builds on the principles of the nozzle system and uses a pocket of air to prevent cavitation, but does not require nozzles or compressors. While limiting the cost of operation, this membrane is able to provide equal protection to nozzles.

The air-filled rubber membrane is placed directly behind an operating marine propeller in the hull. As in the nozzle method, the differing characteristics of the air in the membrane and the seawater around it reduce the resonance frequency, which in turn increases the point at which cavitation is encountered. The membrane is specially designed so as to reduce the frequency further.

== Alternative materials for propellers ==
This solution focuses on the materials that marine propellers are created from which is a direct factor in cavitation. While redesigning propellers would only garner an extra one or two percent efficiency in operation, changing the materials a propeller is made from has greater effects. The most common blend that marine propellers are created from is the nickel-aluminum bronze blend. While this blend can resist erosion, it remains less effective when resisting cavitation.

An example of this method is the Royal Netherlands Navy, who began experimentation with composite materials such as resins or carbon fibers in 2011. These materials, when formed into a propeller, are flexible enough under pressure to deflect, which can reduce cavitation. Other options are made from carbon fiber, epoxy resin, or even glass, and can produce a hydroelastic effect. As these new propellers are able to flex even while under pressure, the risk of cavitation is reduced.

While replacing propellers is most efficient on ships that are currently under construction, the benefits from newer propeller materials may outweigh the costs of replacing current marine propellers. Despite the initial cost of the propellers, this solution is significantly cheaper to operate, allowing lower cost long distance transit.
