= Cavitation =

Low-pressure voids formed in liquids

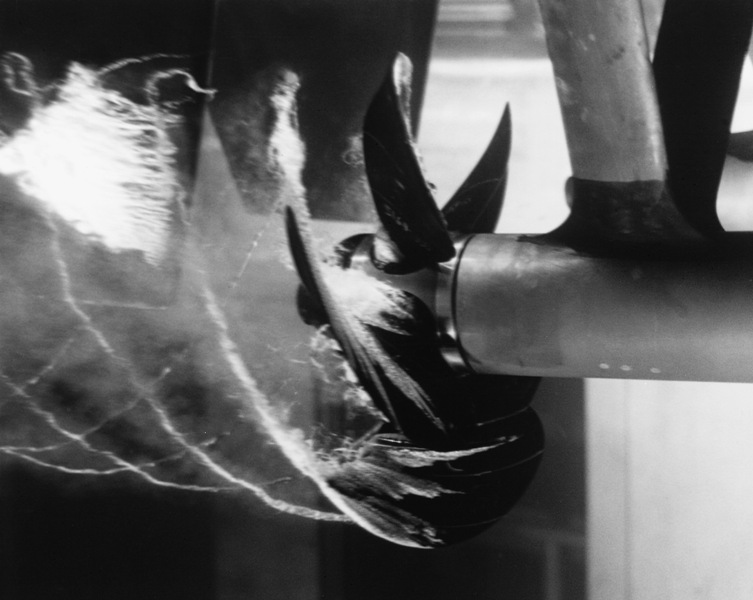
Cavitating propeller model in a water tunnel experiment

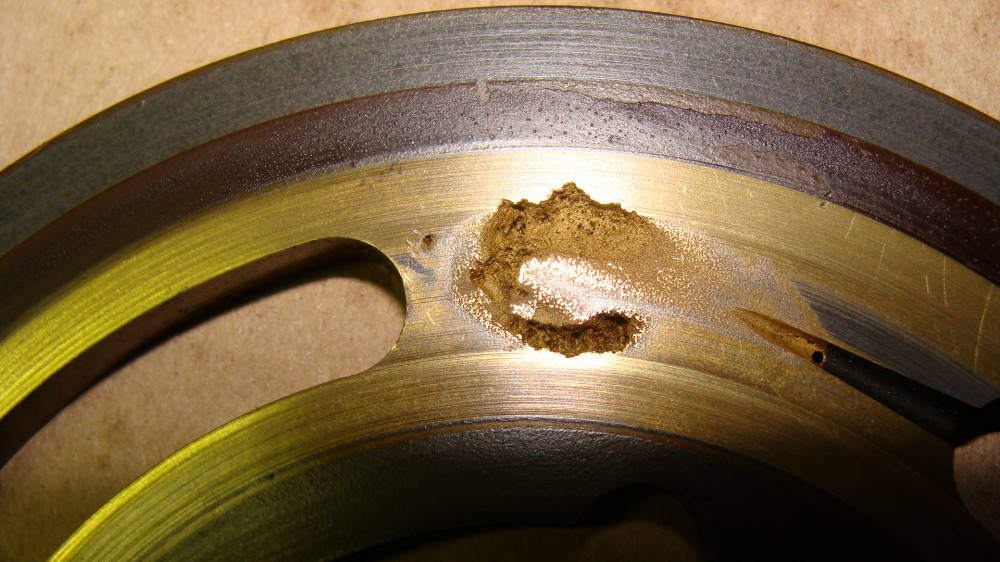
Cavitation damage on a valve plate for an axial piston hydraulic pump

This video shows cavitation in a gear pump

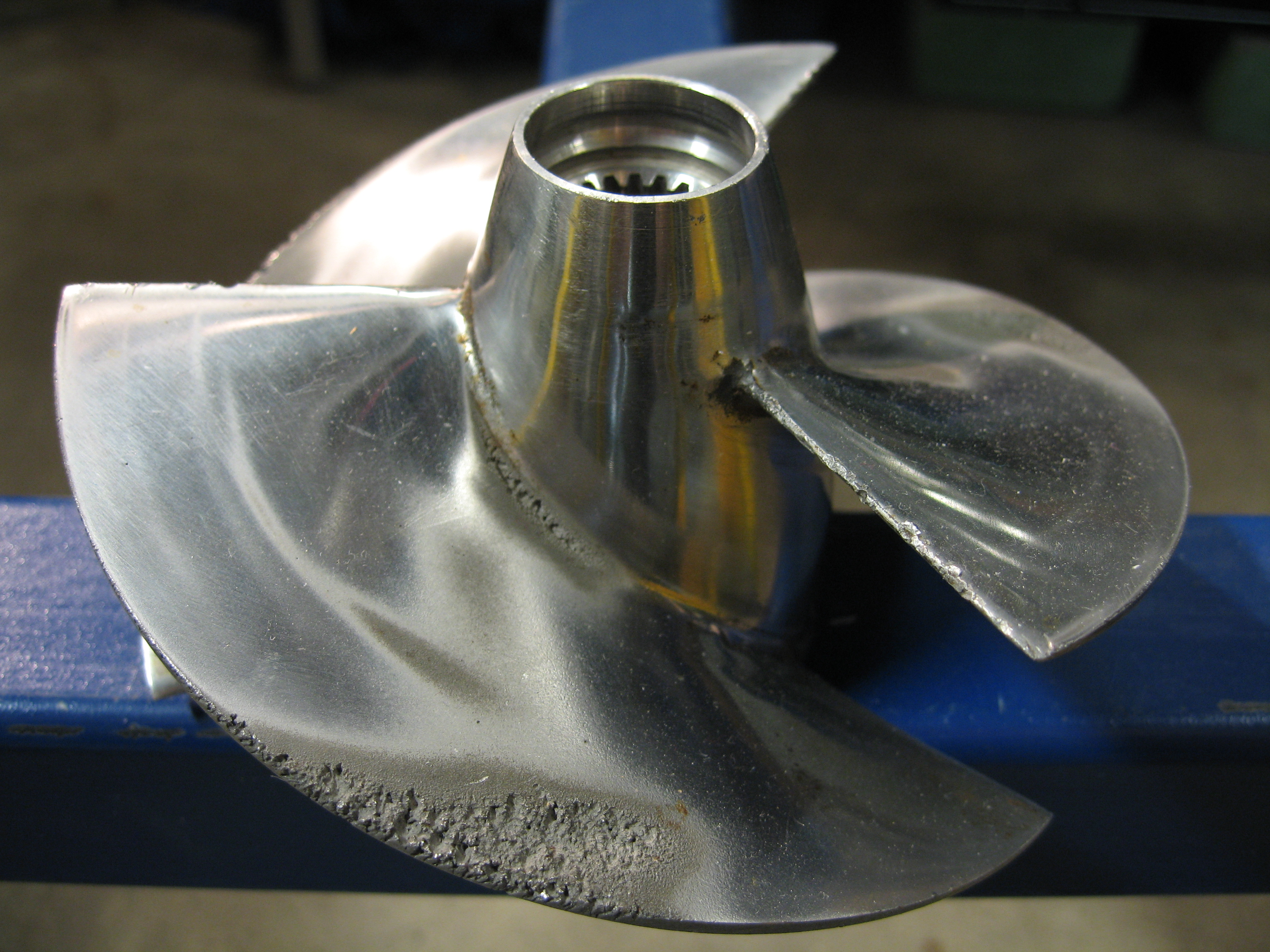
Cavitation damage evident on the propeller of a personal watercraft

Cavitation in fluid mechanics and engineering normally is the phenomenon in which the static pressure of a liquid reduces to below the liquid's vapor pressure, leading to the formation of small vapor-filled cavities in the liquid. When subjected to higher pressure, these cavities, called "bubbles" or "voids", collapse and can generate shock waves that may damage machinery. As a concrete propeller example: The pressure on the suction side of the propeller blades can be very low and when the pressure falls to that of the vapour pressure of the working liquid, cavities filled with gas vapour can form. The process of the formation of these cavities is referred to as cavitation. If the cavities move into the regions of higher pressure (lower velocity), they will implode or collapse. These shock waves are strong when they are very close to the imploded bubble, but rapidly weaken as they propagate away from the implosion. Cavitation collapse is therefore a significant cause of wear in some engineering contexts. Collapsing voids that implode near to a hard surface cause cyclic stress through repeated implosion. This results in surface fatigue of the material, causing a type of damage also called "cavitation damage" or "cavitation erosion". The most common examples of this kind of wear are to pump impellers, and pipe bends where a sudden change in the direction of fast moving liquid occurs.

Cavitation is usually divided into two classes of behavior. Inertial (or transient) cavitation is the process in which a void or bubble in a liquid rapidly collapses, producing a shock wave. It occurs in nature in the strikes of mantis shrimp and pistol shrimp, as well as in the vascular tissues of plants. In manufactured objects, it can occur in control valves, pumps, propellers and impellers. Non-inertial cavitation is the process in which a bubble in a fluid is forced to oscillate in size or shape due to some form of energy input, such as an acoustic field. The gas in the bubble may contain a portion of a different gas than the vapor phase of the liquid. Such cavitation is often employed in ultrasonic cleaning baths and can also be observed in pumps, propellers, etc.

Since the shock waves formed by collapse of the voids are strong enough to cause significant damage to parts, cavitation is typically an undesirable phenomenon in machinery. It may be desirable if intentionally used, for example, to sterilize contaminated surgical instruments, break down pollutants in water purification systems, emulsify tissue for cataract surgery or kidney stone lithotripsy, or homogenize fluids. It is very often specifically prevented in the design of machines such as turbines or propellers, and eliminating cavitation is a major field in the study of fluid dynamics. However, it is sometimes useful and does not cause damage when the bubbles collapse away from machinery surfaces, such as in supercavitation.

== Physics ==
=== Inertial cavitation ===
Inertial cavitation was first observed in the late 19th century, considering the collapse of a spherical void within a liquid. When a volume of liquid is subjected to a sufficiently low pressure, it may rupture and form a cavity. This phenomenon is coined cavitation inception and may occur behind the blade of a rapidly rotating propeller or on any surface vibrating in the liquid with sufficient amplitude and acceleration. A fast-flowing river can cause cavitation on rock surfaces, particularly when there is a drop-off, such as on a waterfall.

Vapor gases evaporate into the cavity from the surrounding medium; thus, the cavity is not a vacuum at all, but rather a low-pressure vapor (gas) bubble. Once the conditions which caused the bubble to form are no longer present, such as when the bubble moves downstream, the surrounding liquid begins to implode due its higher pressure, building up momentum as it moves inward. As the bubble finally collapses, the inward momentum of the surrounding liquid causes a sharp increase of pressure and temperature of the vapor within. The bubble eventually collapses to a minute fraction of its original size, at which point the gas within dissipates into the surrounding liquid via a rather violent mechanism which releases a significant amount of energy in the form of an acoustic shock wave and as visible light. At the point of total collapse, the temperature of the vapor within the bubble may be several thousand Kelvin, and the pressure several hundred atmospheres.

The physical process of cavitation inception is similar to boiling. The major difference between the two is the thermodynamic paths that precede the formation of the vapor. Boiling occurs when the local temperature of the liquid reaches the saturation temperature, and further heat is supplied to allow the liquid to sufficiently phase change into a gas. Cavitation inception occurs when the local pressure falls sufficiently far below the saturated vapor pressure, a value given by the tensile strength of the liquid at a certain temperature.

In order for cavitation inception to occur, the cavitation "bubbles" generally need a surface on which they can nucleate. This surface can be provided by the sides of a container, by impurities in the liquid, or by small undissolved microbubbles within the liquid. It is generally accepted that hydrophobic surfaces stabilize small bubbles. These pre-existing bubbles start to grow unbounded when they are exposed to a pressure below the threshold pressure, termed Blake's threshold. The presence of an incompressible core inside a cavitation nucleus substantially lowers the cavitation threshold below the Blake threshold.

The vapor pressure here differs from the meteorological definition of vapor pressure, which describes the partial pressure of water in the atmosphere at some value less than 100% saturation. Vapor pressure as relating to cavitation refers to the vapor pressure in equilibrium conditions and can therefore be more accurately defined as the equilibrium (or saturated) vapor pressure.

Non-inertial cavitation is the process in which small bubbles in a liquid are forced to oscillate in the presence of an acoustic field, when the intensity of the acoustic field is insufficient to cause total bubble collapse. This form of cavitation causes significantly less erosion than inertial cavitation, and is often used for the cleaning of delicate materials, such as silicon wafers.

Other ways of generating cavitation voids involve the local deposition of energy, such as an intense focused laser pulse (optic cavitation) or with an electrical discharge through a spark. These techniques have been used to study the evolution of the bubble that is actually created by locally boiling the liquid with a local increment of temperature.

=== Hydrodynamic cavitation ===
Hydrodynamic cavitation is the process of vaporisation, bubble generation and bubble implosion which occurs in a flowing liquid as a result of a decrease and subsequent increase in local pressure. Cavitation will only occur if the local pressure declines to some point below the saturated vapor pressure of the liquid and subsequent recovery above the vapor pressure. If the recovery pressure is not above the vapor pressure then flashing is said to have occurred. In pipe systems, cavitation typically occurs either as the result of an increase in the kinetic energy (through an area constriction) or an increase in the pipe elevation.

Hydrodynamic cavitation can be produced by passing a liquid through a constricted channel at a specific flow velocity or by mechanical rotation of an object through a liquid. In the case of the constricted channel and based on the specific (or unique) geometry of the system, the combination of pressure and kinetic energy can create the hydrodynamic cavitation cavern downstream of the local constriction generating high energy cavitation bubbles.

Based on the thermodynamic phase change diagram, an increase in temperature could initiate a known phase change mechanism known as boiling. However, a decrease in static pressure could also help one pass the multi-phase diagram and initiate another phase change mechanism known as cavitation. On the other hand, a local increase in flow velocity could lead to a static pressure drop to the critical point at which cavitation could be initiated (based on Bernoulli's principle). The critical pressure point is vapor saturated pressure. In a closed fluidic system where no flow leakage is detected, a decrease in cross-sectional area would lead to velocity increment and hence static pressure drop. This is the working principle of many hydrodynamic cavitation based reactors for different applications such as water treatment, energy harvesting, heat transfer enhancement, food processing, etc.

There are different flow patterns detected as a cavitation flow progresses: inception, developed flow, supercavitation, and choked flow. Inception is the first moment that the second phase (gas phase) appears in the system. This is the weakest cavitating flow captured in a system corresponding to the highest cavitation number. When the cavities grow and becomes larger in size in the orifice or venturi structures, developed flow is recorded. The most intense cavitating flow is known as supercavitation where theoretically all the nozzle area of an orifice is filled with gas bubbles. This flow regime corresponds to the lowest cavitation number in a system. After supercavitation, the system is not capable of passing more flow. Hence, velocity does not change while the upstream pressure increase. This would lead to an increase in cavitation number which shows that choked flow occurred.

The process of bubble generation, and the subsequent growth and collapse of the cavitation bubbles, results in very high energy densities and in very high local temperatures and local pressures at the surface of the bubbles for a very short time. The overall liquid medium environment, therefore, remains at ambient conditions. When uncontrolled, cavitation is damaging; by controlling the flow of the cavitation, however, the power can be harnessed and non-destructive. Controlled cavitation can be used to enhance chemical reactions or propagate certain unexpected reactions because free radicals are generated in the process due to disassociation of vapors trapped in the cavitating bubbles.

Orifices and venturi are reported to be widely used for generating cavitation. A venturi has an inherent advantage over an orifice because of its smooth converging and diverging sections, such that it can generate a higher flow velocity at the throat for a given pressure drop across it. On the other hand, an orifice has an advantage that it can accommodate a greater number of holes (larger perimeter of holes) in a given cross sectional area of the pipe.

The cavitation phenomenon can be controlled to enhance the performance of high-speed marine vessels and projectiles, as well as in material processing technologies, in medicine, etc. Controlling the cavitating flows in liquids can be achieved only by advancing the mathematical foundation of the cavitation processes. These processes are manifested in different ways, the most common ones and promising for control being bubble cavitation and supercavitation. The first exact classical solution should perhaps be credited to the well-known solution by Hermann von Helmholtz in 1868. The earliest distinguished studies of academic type on the theory of a cavitating flow with free boundaries and supercavitation were published in the book Jets, wakes and cavities followed by Theory of jets of ideal fluid. Widely used in these books was the well-developed theory of conformal mappings of functions of a complex variable, allowing one to derive a large number of exact solutions of plane problems. Another venue combining the existing exact solutions with approximated and heuristic models was explored in the work Hydrodynamics of Flows with Free Boundaries that refined the applied calculation techniques based on the principle of cavity expansion independence, theory of pulsations and stability of elongated axisymmetric cavities, etc. and in Dimensionality and similarity methods in the problems of the hydromechanics of vessels.

A natural continuation of these studies was recently presented in The Hydrodynamics of Cavitating Flows – an encyclopedic work encompassing all the best advances in this domain for the last three decades, and blending the classical methods of mathematical research with the modern capabilities of computer technologies. These include elaboration of nonlinear numerical methods of solving 3D cavitation problems, refinement of the known plane linear theories, development of asymptotic theories of axisymmetric and nearly axisymmetric flows, etc. As compared to the classical approaches, the new trend is characterized by expansion of the theory into the 3D flows. It also reflects a certain correlation with current works of an applied character on the hydrodynamics of supercavitating bodies.

Hydrodynamic cavitation can also improve some industrial processes. For instance, cavitated corn slurry shows higher yields in ethanol production compared to uncavitated corn slurry in dry milling facilities.

This is also used in the mineralization of bio-refractory compounds which otherwise would need extremely high temperature and pressure conditions since free radicals are generated in the process due to the dissociation of vapors trapped in the cavitating bubbles, which results in either the intensification of the chemical reaction or may even result in the propagation of certain reactions not possible under otherwise ambient conditions.

=== Acoustic cavitation and ultrasonic cavitation ===
Inertial cavitation can also occur in the presence of an acoustic field. Microscopic gas bubbles that are generally present in a liquid will be forced to oscillate due to an applied acoustic field. If the acoustic intensity is sufficiently high, the bubbles will first grow in size and then rapidly collapse. Hence, inertial cavitation can occur even if the rarefaction in the liquid is insufficient for a Rayleigh-like void to occur.

Ultrasonic cavitation inception will occur when the acceleration of the ultrasound source is enough to produce the needed pressure drop. This pressure drop depends on the value of the acceleration and the size of the affected volume by the pressure wave. The dimensionless number that predicts ultrasonic cavitation is the Garcia-Atance number. High power ultrasonic horns produce accelerations high enough to create a cavitating region that can be used for homogenization, dispersion, deagglomeration, erosion, cleaning, milling, emulsification, extraction, disintegration, and sonochemistry.

== Applications ==
=== Water transport ===
In supercavitation, cavitation is intentionally induced around high-speed submerged objects to reduce skin drag.

=== Chemical engineering ===
Cavitating water purification devices have also been designed, in which the extreme conditions of cavitation can break down pollutants and organic molecules. Spectral analysis of light emitted in sonochemical reactions reveal chemical and plasma-based mechanisms of energy transfer. The light emitted from cavitation bubbles is termed sonoluminescence.

Use of this technology has been tried successfully in alkali refining of vegetable oils.

Hydrophobic chemicals are attracted underwater by cavitation as the pressure difference between the bubbles and the liquid water forces them to join. This effect may assist in protein folding.

=== Biomedical ===
Cavitation plays an important role for the destruction of kidney stones in shock wave lithotripsy. Currently, tests are being conducted as to whether cavitation can be used to transfer large molecules into biological cells (sonoporation). Nitrogen cavitation is a method used in research to lyse cell membranes while leaving organelles intact.

Cavitation plays a key role in non-thermal, non-invasive fractionation of tissue for treatment of a variety of diseases and can be used to open the blood-brain barrier to increase uptake of neurological drugs in the brain.

Cavitation also plays a role in HIFU, a thermal non-invasive treatment methodology for cancer.

In wounds caused by high velocity impacts (like for example bullet wounds) there are also effects due to cavitation. The exact wounding mechanisms are not completely understood yet as there is temporary cavitation, and permanent cavitation together with crushing, tearing and stretching. Also the high variance in density within the body makes it hard to determine its effects.

Ultrasound sometimes is used to increase bone formation, for instance in post-surgical applications.

It has been suggested that the sound of "cracking" knuckles derives from the collapse of cavitation in the synovial fluid within the joint.

Cavitation can also form Ozone micro-nanobubbles which shows promise in dental applications.

=== Cleaning ===
In industrial cleaning applications, cavitation has sufficient power to overcome the particle-to-substrate adhesion forces, loosening contaminants. The threshold pressure required to initiate cavitation is a strong function of the pulse width and the power input. This method works by generating acoustic cavitation in the cleaning fluid, picking up and carrying contaminant particles away in the hope that they do not reattach to the material being cleaned (which is a possibility when the object is immersed, for example in an ultrasonic cleaning bath). The same physical forces that remove contaminants also have the potential to damage the target being cleaned.

=== Food and beverage ===
==== Eggs ====
Cavitation has been applied to egg pasteurization. A hole-filled rotor produces cavitation bubbles, heating the liquid from within. Equipment surfaces stay cooler than the passing liquid, so eggs do not harden as they did on the hot surfaces of older equipment. The intensity of cavitation can be adjusted, making it possible to tune the process for minimum protein damage.

==== Vegetable oil production ====
Cavitation has been applied to vegetable oil degumming and refining since 2011 and is considered a proven and standard technology in this application. The implementation of hydrodynamic cavitation in the degumming and refining process allows for a significant reduction in process aid, such as chemicals, water and bleaching clay, use.

=== Biofuels ===
==== Biodiesel ====
Cavitation has been applied to Biodiesel production since 2011 and is considered a proven and standard technology in this application. The implementation of hydrodynamic cavitation in the transesterification process allows for a significant reduction in catalyst use, quality improvement and production capacity increase.

== Cavitation damage ==
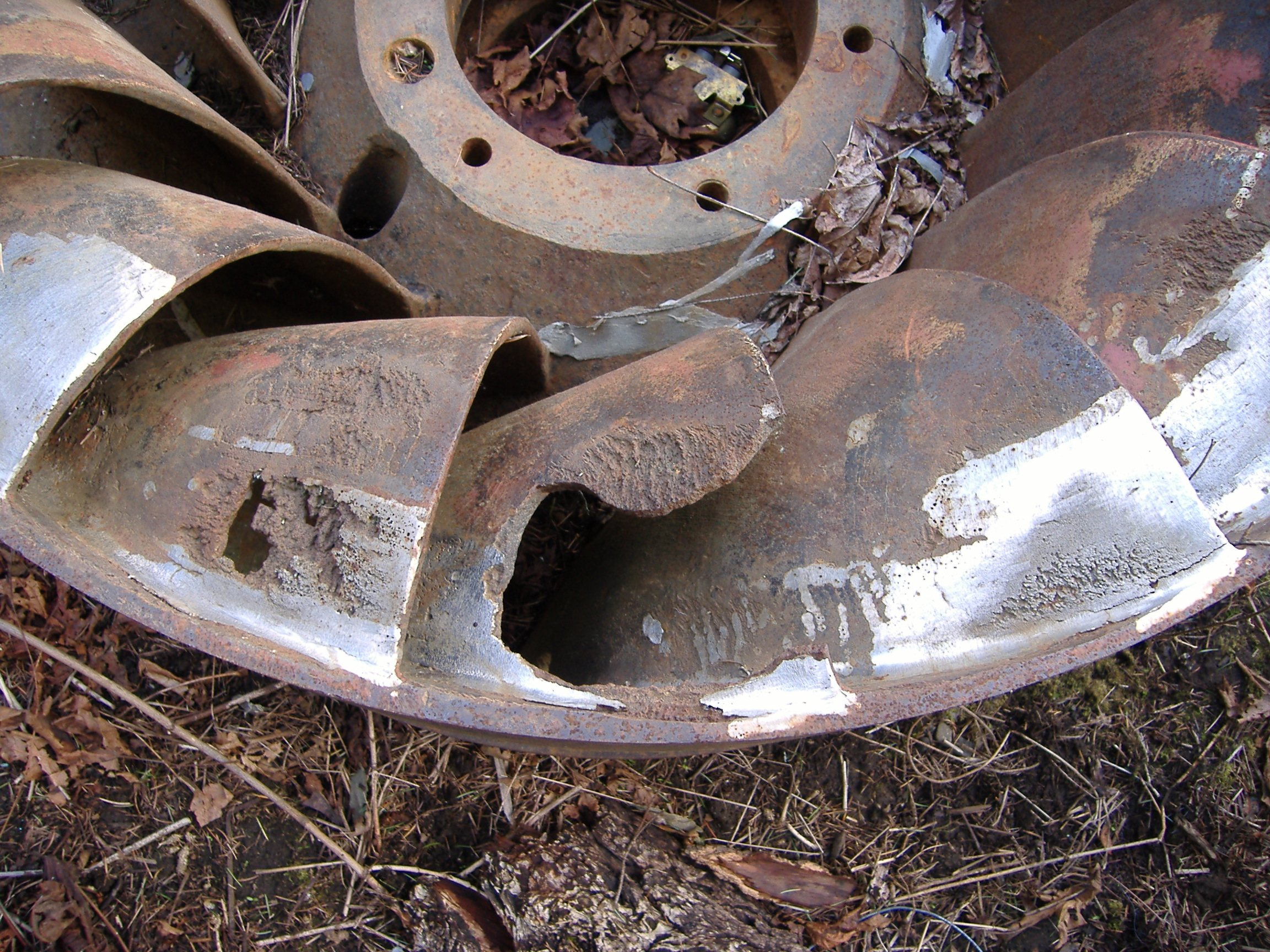
Cavitation damage to a Francis turbine

Cavitation is usually an undesirable occurrence. In devices such as propellers and pumps, cavitation causes a great deal of noise, damage to components, vibrations, and a loss of efficiency. Noise caused by cavitation can be particularly undesirable in naval vessels where such noise may render them more easily detectable by passive sonar. Cavitation has also become a concern in the renewable energy sector as it may occur on the blade surface of tidal stream turbines.

When the cavitation bubbles collapse, they force energetic liquid into very small volumes, thereby creating spots of high temperature and emitting shock waves, the latter of which are a source of noise. The noise created by cavitation is a particular problem for military submarines, as it increases the chances of being detected by passive sonar.

Although the collapse of a small cavity is a relatively low-energy event, highly localized collapses can erode metals, such as steel, over time. The pitting caused by the collapse of cavities produces great wear on components and can dramatically shorten a propeller's or pump's lifetime.

After a surface is initially affected by cavitation, it tends to erode at an accelerating pace. The cavitation pits increase the turbulence of the fluid flow and create crevices that act as nucleation sites for additional cavitation bubbles. The pits also increase the components' surface area and leave behind residual stresses. This makes the surface more prone to stress corrosion.

=== Pumps and propellers ===
Major places where cavitation occurs are in pumps, on propellers, or at restrictions in a flowing liquid.

As an impeller's (in a pump) or propeller's (as in the case of a ship or submarine) blades move through a fluid, low-pressure areas are formed as the fluid accelerates around and moves past the blades. The faster the blade moves, the lower the pressure can become around it. As it reaches vapor pressure, the fluid vaporizes and forms small bubbles of gas. This is cavitation. When the bubbles collapse later, they typically cause very strong local shock waves in the fluid, which may be audible and may even damage the blades.

Cavitation in pumps may occur in two different forms: suction cavitation and discharge cavitation.

==== Suction cavitation ====
Suction cavitation occurs when the pump suction is under a low-pressure/high-vacuum condition where the liquid turns into a vapor at the eye of the pump impeller. This vapor is carried over to the discharge side of the pump, where it no longer sees vacuum and is compressed back into a liquid by the discharge pressure. This imploding action occurs violently and attacks the face of the impeller. An impeller that has been operating under a suction cavitation condition can have large chunks of material removed from its face or very small bits of material removed, causing the impeller to look spongelike. Both cases will cause premature failure of the pump, often due to bearing failure. Suction cavitation is often identified by a sound like gravel or marbles in the pump casing.

Common causes of suction cavitation can include clogged filters, pipe blockage on the suction side, poor piping design, pump running too far right on the pump curve, or conditions not meeting NPSH (net positive suction head) requirements.

In automotive applications, a clogged filter in a hydraulic system (power steering, power brakes) can cause suction cavitation making a noise that rises and falls in synch with engine RPM. It is fairly often a high pitched whine, like set of nylon gears not quite meshing correctly.

==== Discharge cavitation ====
Discharge cavitation occurs when the pump discharge pressure is extremely high, normally occurring in a pump that is running at less than 10% of its best efficiency point. The high discharge pressure causes the majority of the fluid to circulate inside the pump instead of being allowed to flow out the discharge. As the liquid flows around the impeller, it must pass through the small clearance between the impeller and the pump housing at extremely high flow velocity. This flow velocity causes a vacuum to develop at the housing wall (similar to what occurs in a venturi), which turns the liquid into a vapor. A pump that has been operating under these conditions shows premature wear of the impeller vane tips and the pump housing. In addition, due to the high pressure conditions, premature failure of the pump's mechanical seal and bearings can be expected. Under extreme conditions, this can break the impeller shaft.

Discharge cavitation in joint fluid is thought to cause the popping sound produced by bone joint cracking, for example by deliberately cracking one's knuckles.

==== Cavitation solutions ====
Since all pumps require well-developed inlet flow to meet their potential, a pump may not perform or be as reliable as expected due to a faulty suction piping layout such as a close-coupled elbow on the inlet flange. When poorly developed flow enters the pump impeller, it strikes the vanes and is unable to follow the impeller passage. The liquid then separates from the vanes causing mechanical problems due to cavitation, vibration and performance problems due to turbulence and poor filling of the impeller. This results in premature seal, bearing and impeller failure, high maintenance costs, high power consumption, and less-than-specified head and/or flow.

To have a well-developed flow pattern, pump manufacturer's manuals recommend about (10 diameters?) of straight pipe run upstream of the pump inlet flange. Unfortunately, piping designers and plant personnel must contend with space and equipment layout constraints and usually cannot comply with this recommendation. Instead, it is common to use an elbow close-coupled to the pump suction which creates a poorly developed flow pattern at the pump suction.

With a double-suction pump tied to a close-coupled elbow, flow distribution to the impeller is poor and causes reliability and performance shortfalls. The elbow divides the flow unevenly with more channeled to the outside of the elbow. Consequently, one side of the double-suction impeller receives more flow at a higher flow velocity and pressure while the starved side receives a highly turbulent and potentially damaging flow. This degrades overall pump performance (delivered head, flow and power consumption) and causes axial imbalance which shortens seal, bearing and impeller life. To overcome cavitation: Increase suction pressure if possible. Decrease liquid temperature if possible. Throttle back on the discharge valve to decrease flow-rate. Vent gases off the pump casing.

=== Control valves ===
Cavitation can occur in control valves. If the actual pressure drop across the valve as defined by the upstream and downstream pressures in the system is greater than the sizing calculations allow, pressure drop flashing or cavitation may occur. The change from a liquid state to a vapor state results from the increase in flow velocity at or just downstream of the greatest flow restriction which is normally the valve port. To maintain a steady flow of liquid through a valve the flow velocity must be greatest at the vena contracta or the point where the cross sectional area is the smallest. This increase in flow velocity is accompanied by a substantial decrease in the fluid pressure which is partially recovered downstream as the area increases and flow velocity decreases. This pressure recovery is never completely to the level of the upstream pressure. If the pressure at the vena contracta drops below the vapor pressure of the fluid bubbles will form in the flow stream. If the pressure recovers after the valve to a pressure that is once again above the vapor pressure, then the vapor bubbles will collapse and cavitation will occur.

=== Spillways ===
When water flows over a dam spillway, the irregularities on the spillway surface will cause small areas of flow separation in a high-speed flow, and, in these regions, the pressure will be lowered. If the flow velocities are high enough the pressure may fall to below the local vapor pressure of the water and vapor bubbles will form. When these are carried downstream into a high pressure region the bubbles collapse giving rise to high pressures and possible cavitation damage.

Experimental investigations show that the damage on concrete chute and tunnel spillways can start at clear water flow velocities of between 12 and 15 m/s (27 and 34 mph), and, up to flow velocities of 20 m/s (45 mph), it may be possible to protect the surface by streamlining the boundaries, improving the surface finishes or using resistant materials.

When some air is present in the water the resulting mixture is compressible and this damps the high pressure caused by the bubble collapses. If the flow velocities near the spillway invert are sufficiently high, aerators (or aeration devices) must be introduced to prevent cavitation. Although these have been installed for some years, the mechanisms of air entrainment at the aerators and the slow movement of the air away from the spillway surface are still challenging.

The spillway aeration device design is based upon a small deflection of the spillway bed (or sidewall) such as a ramp and offset to deflect the high flow velocity flow away from the spillway surface. In the cavity formed below the nappe, a local subpressure beneath the nappe is produced by which air is sucked into the flow. The complete design includes the deflection device (ramp, offset) and the air supply system.

=== Engines ===
Some larger diesel engines suffer from cavitation due to high compression and undersized cylinder walls. Vibrations of the cylinder wall induce alternating low and high pressure in the coolant against the cylinder wall. The result is pitting of the cylinder wall, which will eventually let cooling fluid leak into the cylinder and combustion gases to leak into the coolant.

It is possible to prevent this from happening with the use of chemical additives in the cooling fluid that form a protective layer on the cylinder wall. This layer will be exposed to the same cavitation, but rebuilds itself. Additionally a regulated overpressure in the cooling system (regulated and maintained by the coolant filler cap spring pressure) prevents the forming of cavitation.

From about the 1980s, new designs of smaller gasoline engines also displayed cavitation phenomena. One answer to the need for smaller and lighter engines was a smaller coolant volume and a correspondingly higher coolant flow velocity. This gave rise to rapid changes in flow velocity and therefore rapid changes of static pressure in areas of high heat transfer. Where resulting vapor bubbles collapsed against a surface, they had the effect of first disrupting protective oxide layers (of cast aluminium materials) and then repeatedly damaging the newly formed surface, preventing the action of some types of corrosion inhibitor (such as silicate based inhibitors). A final problem was the effect that increased material temperature had on the relative electrochemical reactivity of the base metal and its alloying constituents. The result was deep pits that could form and penetrate the engine head in a matter of hours when the engine was running at high load and high speed. These effects could largely be avoided by the use of organic corrosion inhibitors or (preferably) by designing the engine head in such a way as to avoid certain cavitation inducing conditions.

== In nature ==
=== Geology ===
Some hypotheses relating to diamond formation posit a possible role for cavitation—namely cavitation in the kimberlite pipes providing the extreme pressure needed to change pure carbon into the rare allotrope that is diamond. The loudest three sounds ever recorded, during the 1883 eruption of Krakatoa, are now understood as the bursts of three huge cavitation bubbles, each larger than the last, formed in the volcano's throat. Rising magma, filled with dissolved gasses and under immense pressure, encountered a different magma that compressed easily, allowing bubbles to grow and combine.

=== Vascular plants ===
Cavitation can occur in the xylem of vascular plants. The sap vaporizes locally so that either the vessel elements or tracheids are filled with water vapor. Plants are able to repair cavitated xylem in a number of ways. For plants less than 50 cm tall, root pressure can be sufficient to redissolve the vapor. Larger plants direct solutes into the xylem via ray cells, or in tracheids, via osmosis through bordered pits. Solutes attract water, the pressure rises and vapor can redissolve. In some trees, the sound of the cavitation is audible, particularly in summer, when the rate of evapotranspiration is highest. Some deciduous trees have to shed leaves in the autumn partly because cavitation increases as temperatures decrease.

=== Spore dispersal in plants ===
Cavitation plays a role in the spore dispersal mechanisms of certain plants. In ferns, for example, the fern sporangium acts as a catapult that launches spores into the air. The charging phase of the catapult is driven by water evaporation from the annulus cells, which triggers a pressure decrease. When the compressive pressure reaches approximately 9 MPa, cavitation occurs. This rapid event triggers spore dispersal due to the elastic energy released by the annulus structure. The initial spore acceleration is extremely large – up to 10^{5} times the gravitational acceleration.

=== Marine life ===
Just as cavitation bubbles form on a fast-spinning boat propeller, they may also form on the tails and fins of aquatic animals. This primarily occurs near the surface of the ocean, where the ambient water pressure is low.

Cavitation may limit the maximum swimming speed of powerful swimming animals like dolphins and tuna. Dolphins may have to restrict their speed because collapsing cavitation bubbles on their tail are painful. Tuna have bony fins without nerve endings and do not feel pain from cavitation. They are slowed down when cavitation bubbles create a vapor film around their fins. Lesions have been found on tuna that are consistent with cavitation damage.

Some sea animals have found ways to use cavitation to their advantage when hunting prey. The pistol shrimp snaps a specialized claw to create cavitation, which can kill small fish. The mantis shrimp (of the smasher variety) uses cavitation as well in order to stun, smash open, or kill the shellfish that it feasts upon.

Thresher sharks use 'tail slaps' to debilitate their small fish prey and cavitation bubbles have been seen rising from the apex of the tail arc.

=== Coastal erosion ===
In the last half-decade, coastal erosion in the form of inertial cavitation has been generally accepted. Bubbles in an incoming wave are forced into cracks in the cliff being eroded. Varying pressure decompresses some vapor pockets which subsequently implode. The resulting pressure peaks can blast apart fractions of the rock.

== History ==
As early as 1754, the Swiss mathematician Leonhard Euler (1707–1783) speculated about the possibility of cavitation. In 1859, the English mathematician William Henry Besant (1828–1917) published a solution to the problem of the dynamics of the collapse of a spherical cavity in a fluid, which had been presented by the Anglo-Irish mathematician George Stokes (1819–1903) as one of the Cambridge University Senate-house problems and riders for the year 1847. In 1894, Irish fluid dynamicist Osborne Reynolds (1842–1912) studied the formation and collapse of vapor bubbles in boiling liquids and in constricted tubes.

The term cavitation first appeared in 1895 in a paper by John Isaac Thornycroft (1843–1928) and Sydney Walker Barnaby (1855–1925)—son of Sir Nathaniel Barnaby (1829 – 1915), who had been Chief Constructor of the Royal Navy—to whom it had been suggested by the British engineer Robert Edmund Froude (1846–1924), third son of the English hydrodynamicist William Froude (1810–1879). Early experimental studies of cavitation were conducted in 1894–5 by Thornycroft and Barnaby and by the Anglo-Irish engineer Charles Algernon Parsons (1854–1931), who constructed a stroboscopic apparatus to study the phenomenon. Thornycroft and Barnaby were the first researchers to observe cavitation on the back sides of propeller blades.

In 1917, the British physicist Lord Rayleigh (1842–1919) extended Besant's work, publishing a mathematical model of cavitation in an incompressible fluid (ignoring surface tension and viscosity), in which he also determined the pressure in the fluid. The mathematical models of cavitation which were developed by British engineer Stanley Smith Cook (1875–1952) and by Lord Rayleigh revealed that collapsing bubbles of vapor could generate very high pressures, which were capable of causing the damage that had been observed on ships' propellers. Experimental evidence of cavitation causing such high pressures was initially collected in 1952 by Mark Harrison (a fluid dynamicist and acoustician at the U.S. Navy's David Taylor Model Basin at Carderock, Maryland, USA) who used acoustic methods and in 1956 by Wernfried Güth (a physicist and acoustician of Göttigen University, Germany) who used optical Schlieren photography.

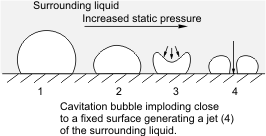
The implosion of a cavitation bubble causes a high-speed jet of fluid to impact a fixed surface

In 1944, Soviet scientists Mark Iosifovich Kornfeld (1908–1993) and L. Suvorov of the Leningrad Physico-Technical Institute (now: the Ioffe Physical-Technical Institute of the Russian Academy of Sciences, St. Petersburg, Russia) proposed that during cavitation, bubbles in the vicinity of a solid surface do not collapse symmetrically; instead, a dimple forms on the bubble at a point opposite the solid surface and this dimple evolves into a jet of liquid. This jet of liquid damages the solid surface. This hypothesis was supported in 1951 by theoretical studies by Maurice Rattray Jr., a doctoral student at the California Institute of Technology. Kornfeld and Suvorov's hypothesis was confirmed experimentally in 1961 by Charles F. Naudé and Albert T. Ellis, fluid dynamicists at the California Institute of Technology.

A series of experimental investigations of the propagation of strong shock wave (SW) in a liquid with gas bubbles, which made it possible to establish the basic laws governing the process, the mechanism for the transformation of the energy of the SW, attenuation of the SW, and the formation of the structure, and experiments on the analysis of the attenuation of waves in bubble screens with different acoustic properties were begun by pioneer works of Soviet scientist prof.V.F. Minin at the Institute of Hydrodynamics (Novosibirsk, Russia) in 1957–1960, who examined also the first convenient model of a screen - a sequence of alternating flat one-dimensional liquid and gas layers. In an experimental investigations of the dynamics of the form of pulsating gaseous cavities and interaction of SW with bubble clouds in 1957–1960 V.F. Minin discovered that under the action of SW a bubble collapses asymmetrically with the formation of a cumulative jet, which forms in the process of collapse and causes fragmentation of the bubble.

== See also ==
- Cavitation number – Concept in fluid mechanics
- Cavitation modelling – Type of computational fluid dynamic
- Erosion corrosion of copper water tubes – Effect of corrosion and erosion by water
- Rayleigh–Plesset equation – Ordinary differential equation
- Solutions for cavitation in marine propellers
- Sonoluminescence – Luminescence induced by sound waves
- Supercavitation – Use of a cavitation bubble to reduce skin friction drag on a submerged object
- Supercavitating propeller – Marine propeller designed to operate with a full cavitation bubble
- Water hammer – Pressure surge when a fluid is forced to stop or change direction suddenly
- Water tunnel (hydrodynamic) – Tool used to investigate the movement of water
- Ultrasonic cavitation device – Surgical device using ultrasound to break up tissues
