= Euler number (physics) =

Parameter in fluid flow calculations

The Euler number (Eu) is a dimensionless number used in fluid flow calculations. It expresses the relationship between a local pressure drop caused by a restriction and the kinetic energy per volume of the flow, and is used to characterize energy losses in the flow, where a perfect frictionless flow corresponds to an Euler number of 0. The inverse of the Euler number is referred to as the Ruark Number with the symbol Ru.

The Euler number is defined as

$$\mathrm{Eu}
= \frac{ \text{pressure forces} }{ \text{inertial forces} }
= \frac{ (\text{pressure}) (\text{area}) }{ (\text{mass})(\text{acceleration}) }
= \frac{ (p_u - p_d) \, L^2}{(\rho L^3) (v^2 / L)}
= \frac{p_u - p_d}{\rho v^2}$$

where

- $\rho$ is the density of the fluid.
- $p_u$ is the upstream pressure.
- $p_d$ is the downstream pressure.
- $v$ is a characteristic velocity of the flow.

An alternative definition of the Euler number is given by Shah and Sekulic
$$\mathrm{Eu}
= \frac{\text{pressure drop}}{\text{dynamic head}}
= \frac{\Delta p}{\rho v^2 / 2}$$

where

- $\Delta p$ is the pressure drop $= p_u - p_d$

== See also ==
- Darcy–Weisbach equation is a different way of interpreting the Euler number
- Reynolds number for use in flow analysis and similarity of flows
- Cavitation number a similarly formulated number with different meaning
- List of topics named after Leonhard Euler
