= Sivaramakrishnan Balachandar =

American fluid mechanist

Sivaramakrishnan Balachandar is a professor at the University of Illinois Urbana-Champaign. Sivaramakrishnan is an American physicist, a Distinguished Professor and William F. Powers Professor at University of Florida.

Balachandar has contributed to the understanding of thermal convection in the Earth's mantle, the structure of bluff body wakes and their effect on the dynamics of small particles, the dynamics of vortices in wall turbulence, and the theory of two-phase flow, including the equilibrium Euler formulation for dispersion force.

He was made a Fellow of the American Physical Society after being nominated by their Division of Fluid Dynamics in 2006., and he received the Francois Naftali Frenkiel Award from the American Physical Society Division of Fluid Dynamics in 1996 He is also a fellow of the American Society of Mechanical Engineers.

== Publications ==
His most cited articles are:

- Jigen Zhou, Ronald J Adrian, S Balachandar, TM Kendall. Mechanisms for generating coherent packets of hairpin vortices in channel flow (1999) Journal of Fluid Mechanics 387:353-396 (cited 1902 times)
- S Balachandar, JK Eaton. Turbulent dispersed multiphase flow (2010) Annual Review of Fluid Mechanics 42, 111–133. (cited 1200 times)
- P. Chakraborty, S Balachandar, RJ Adrian, On the relationships between local vortex identification schemes (2005) Journal of fluid mechanics 535: 189 (838 citations)
- H Aref, S Balachandar Chaotic advection in a Stokes flow (1986) Physics of Fluids 29 (11), 3515-3521 (344 citations)
- J. Robichaux, S Balachandar, SP Vanka. Three-dimensional Floquet instability of the wake of square cylinder. (1999) Physics of Fluids 11 (3), 560-578 (331 citations)
- R Mittal, S Balachandar Effect of three‐dimensionality on the lift and drag of nominally two‐dimensional cylinders Physics of Fluids 7 (8), 1841-18 (295 citations)

== See also ==
- List of fellows of the American Physical Society (1998–2010)
