= Ozone micro-nanobubbles =

Technology to improve oxidation efficiency of ozone

Ozone micro/nano-bubble technology overcomes the limitation of ozone oxidation and mass transfer of ozone and its utilization. It improves the oxidation efficiency of ozone. Ozone micro/nano-bubble technology improves the disinfectant capacity of ozone.

Ozone is a strong oxidizing agent widely used in the treatment of printing and dyeing wastewater, and coal chemical wastewater. Its solubility in water is less and stability is also poor, which will reduce the degradation capacity of ozone towards organic molecules. For improving its ability mass-transfer efficiency ozone micro/nano-bubble(MNB) is an important technology. For improving, gas-liquid contact and mass-transfer effectiveness air microbubbles were used. While in the case of ozone, MNB improves the properties of ozonation or oxidation.

== Methods ==
MNB can be generated and formed by two pathways which are as follows: -

1. The nucleation of the new gas phase emerging from the liquid phase.

2. Collapse of microbubbles

The growth and the collapse of microbubbles in the solution can be distinct as cavitation, and there are four types based on the mode of generation:

=== Hydrodynamic cavitation ===
It defines as the change in the geometry of the fluid, which leads to the occurrence of vaporization and generation of MNB. Enhancing the formation of MNB hydrodynamic cavitation by mechanical agitation, axial flow shearing, and depressurized flow constriction

=== Acoustic cavitation ===
It can be created by ultrasonic waves, which leads to the establishment of local pressure variations in liquid and then the formation of bubbles.

=== Optical cavitation ===
In this method, MNBs were produced by short-pulsed lasers, which were focused into a low absorption coefficient solution.

=== Particle cavitation ===
Nano-bubbles were produced by water passing through high-intensity light photons in liquids. Other methods were also used for the formation of MNB.

electrolysis, nanopore membranes, sonochemistry using ultrasound, and water-solvent mixing.

== Characteristics ==
MNBs are the gaseous body. Microbubble has a size between 10-50μm, while nano-bubble has a size of less than 200 nm. There are a few characteristics of MNBs, which are as follows: -

=== Surface area ===
MNBs have small diameters, so their specific surface area is large. It gives a large contact area to liquid which is correlated to a higher reaction rate.

=== Swirl flow ===
MNBs have swirl flow in water. They float slowly in the gas-liquid mass transfer process, and microbubbles have a long residence time in the liquid. Because of their long hysteresis contact area of gas/liquid has been increased, which improves its oxidation ability

=== Zeta potential ===
High negative Zeta Potential is directly related to the stability of MNBs, and most studies verify that this is due to the negatively charged solution reason for this negative charge is the adsorption of hydroxyl ions at the gas-liquid interface. It also avoids aggregation and amalgamation of MNB.

=== Hydroxyl radicals ===
Microbubbles can erupt without external stimulus; this rupture process produces a mass of hydroxyl radicals. Hydroxyl radical has a high oxidation potential and can oxidize organic pollutants in water.

== Disinfection mechanism ==
Ozone MNB can react in two different ways, direct and indirect. Direct involves the degradation of pollutants with ozone itself, while the case indirect involves oxidation with the formation of hydroxyl radicals(•OH).

Hydroxyl radicals will form by the shrinking of microbubbles; it is due to an increase in the value of electromotive force on the liquid interface. Hydroxyl radical(•OH) and H^{+} accumulate rapidly at the bubble interface. Ozone reacts with hydroxyl ions and hydroxyl radicals will form. The formation of hydroxyl radicals is pH-dependent.

== Applications ==
=== Antimicrobial and disinfection process ===
Ozone MNB can deactivate both gram-positive and gram-negative bacteria. This activity of Ozone MNB does not show any cytotoxicity against human health.

=== Drinking water disinfection ===
Ozone MNB gives the same inactivation rate same like conventional ozonation for the target pathogen E.coli, but here in the case of microbubble technology, the ozone dose was lower. As higher mass transfer leads to lower ozone dosage so, this ozone MNB technique is promising and beneficial for the existing water treatment plants.

=== Plant effluents treatment ===
Elimination of industrial pollutants is a major concern as they are discharged into water bodies. Even at low concentrations, they can induce an adverse effect on living organisms and the environment. Ozone MNBs provides better degradation behavior of targeted pollutant as compared to conventional ozonation and also minimizes the discharge of impurities into water bodies.

=== Effect on fish health ===
Ozone has greatest used as a disinfectant in aquaculture systems to reduce pathogenic bacteria to prevent fish disease. In many experiments, it is observed that multiple treatments have not exhibited any deviations either in behavioral patterns or viability of the fish. This technology provides protection to cultivated species from pathogenic infections.

=== Agriculture ===
This technology for washing fresh vegetables was tested, and when acidic electrolyzed water containing ozone ultra-fine bubbles and strong mechanical action combined, it showed the lowest viable bacterial count was recorded among other treatments like using sodium hypochlorite.
