= Milton S. Plesset =

American physicist (1908–1991)

Milton Spinoza Plesset
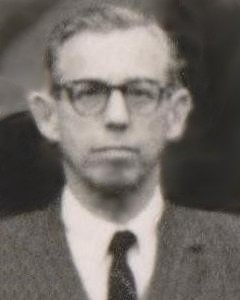
- Plesset in Copenhagen, 1963
- Born: February 7, 1908; Pittsburgh, Pennsylvania
- Died: February 19, 1991 (aged 83)
- Citizenship: United States
- Education: University of Pittsburgh; Yale University
- Known for: Rayleigh–Plesset equation Møller–Plesset perturbation theory
- Awards: ASME Fluids Engineering Award; ASME Thurston Lecture Award (1980)
- Scientific career
- Fields: Fluid dynamics
- Workplaces: University of Rochester; California Institute of Technology
- Doctoral advisor: John Archibald Wheeler
- Doctoral students: Andrea Prosperetti; Norman Zabusky

Milton Spinoza Plesset (7 February 1908 – 19 February 1991) was an American applied physicist who worked in the field of fluid mechanics and nuclear energy. He was elected to the National Academy of Engineering in 1979 for his fundamental contributions to multiphase flows, bubble dynamics, and safety of nuclear reactors. Plesset served as professor of engineering science at California Institute of Technology during 1951 to 1978. Notable scientists Andrea Prosperetti, Norman Zabusky, and Chris Whipple finished their doctoral work under Plesset's guidance. Milton Plesset, Andrea Prosperetti, and Chris Whipple were elected to the National Academy of Engineering.

He is known for the Møller–Plesset perturbation theory, which he developed together with Christian Møller. The Rayleigh–Plesset equation describing the dynamics of a bubble in an infinite body of fluid is also named after him.

== Education and work ==
Born in Pittsburgh, Pennsylvania, Plesset received his bachelor's degree from University of Pittsburgh in 1929 and a Ph.D. from Yale University in 1932. Soon after his Ph.D. Plesset joined Caltech and worked with Robert Oppenheimer. Together, they undertook a theoretical study of positrons using the Dirac equation in quantum electrodynamics to show how electron-positron pairs were formed.
