= Rayleigh–Plesset equation =

Ordinary differential equation

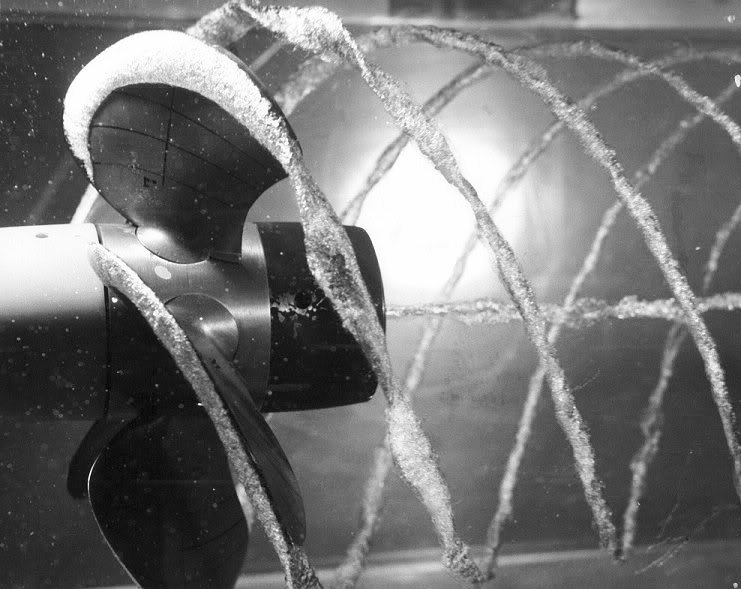
The Rayleigh–Plesset equation is often applied to the study of cavitation bubbles, shown here forming behind a propeller.

In fluid mechanics, the Rayleigh–Plesset equation or Besant–Rayleigh–Plesset equation is a nonlinear ordinary differential equation which governs the dynamics of a spherical bubble in an infinite body of incompressible fluid. Its general form is usually written as

$R\frac{d^2R}{dt^2} + \frac{3}{2}\left(\frac{dR}{dt}\right)^2 + \frac{4\nu_L}{R}\frac{dR}{dt} + \frac{2\sigma}{\rho_LR} + \frac{\Delta P(t)}{\rho_L} =0$

where

$\rho_L$ is the density of the surrounding liquid, assumed to be constant
$R(t)$ is the radius of the bubble
$\nu_L$ is the kinematic viscosity of the surrounding liquid, assumed to be constant
$\sigma$ is the surface tension of the bubble-liquid interface
$\Delta P(t) = P_\infty(t) - P_B(t)$, in which, $P_B(t)$ is the pressure within the bubble, assumed to be uniform and $P_\infty(t)$ is the external pressure infinitely far from the bubble

Provided that $P_B(t)$ is known and $P_\infty(t)$ is given, the Rayleigh–Plesset equation can be used to solve for the time-varying bubble radius $R(t)$.

The Rayleigh–Plesset equation can be derived from the Navier–Stokes equations under the assumption of spherical symmetry. It can also be derived using an energy balance.

== History ==
Neglecting surface tension and viscosity, the equation was first derived by W. H. Besant in his 1859 book with the problem statement stated as An infinite mass of homogeneous incompressible fluid acted upon by no forces is at rest, and a spherical portion of the fluid is suddenly annihilated; it is required to find the instantaneous alteration of pressure at any point of the mass, and the time in which the cavity will be filled up, the pressure at an infinite distance being supposed to remain constant (in fact, Besant attributes the problem to Cambridge Senate-House problems of 1847). Besant predicted the time required to fill an empty cavity of initial radius $R_0$ to be

$$\begin{align}
t&=R_0\sqrt{\frac{6\rho}{P_\infty}}\int_0^1 \frac{z^4\, dz}{\sqrt{1-z^6}}\\
&=  R_0\sqrt{\frac{\pi\rho}{6 P_\infty}} \frac{\Gamma(5/6)}{\Gamma(4/3)} \\
& \approx 0.91468 R_0\sqrt{\frac{\rho}{P_\infty}}
\end{align}$$

Lord Rayleigh found a simpler derivation of the same result, based on conservation of energy. The kinetic energy of the inrushing fluid is $2 \pi \rho U^{2} R^{3}$ where $R$ is the time-dependent radius of the void, and $U$ the radial velocity of the fluid there. The work done by the fluid pressing in at infinity is $4 \pi P_\infty (R_0^{3} - R^{3}) / 3$, and equating these two energies gives a relation between $R$ and $U$. Then, noting that $U = \partial R / \partial t$, separation of variables gives Besant's result. Rayleigh went further than Besant, in evaluating the integral (Euler's beta function) in terms of gamma functions. Rayleigh adapted this approach to the case of a cavity filled with an ideal gas (a bubble) by including a term for the work done compressing the gas.

For the case of the perfectly empty void, Rayleigh determined that the pressure $P$ in the fluid at a radius $r$ is given by:

$$\frac{P}{P_\infty} - 1 = \frac{R}{3 r} \left( \frac{R_0^{3}}{R^{3}} - 4\right) - \frac{R^{4}}{3 r^{4}} \left( \frac{R_0^{3}}{R^{3}} - 1\right)$$

When the void is at least one quarter of its initial volume, then the pressure decreases monotonically from $P_\infty$ at infinity to zero at $R$. As the void shrinks further a pressure maximum, greater than $P_\infty$ appears at

$$r^{3} = \frac{4 (R_0^{3} - R^{3}) R^{3}}{R_0^{3} - 4 R^{3}}$$

very rapidly growing and converging on the void.

The equation was first applied to traveling cavitation bubbles by Milton S. Plesset in 1949 by including effects of surface tension.

== Derivation ==
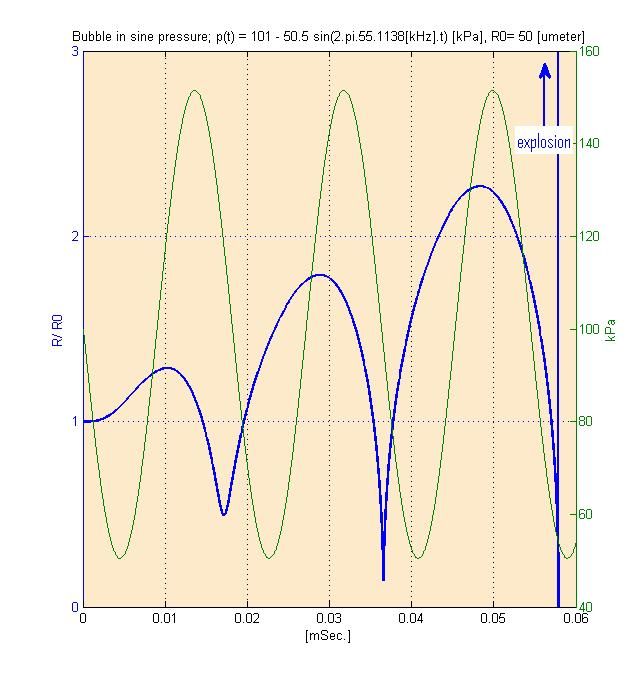
Numerical integration of RP eq. including surface tension and viscosity terms. Initially at rest in atmospheric pressure with R0=50 um, the bubble subjected to oscillatory pressure at its natural frequency undergoes expansion and then collapses.

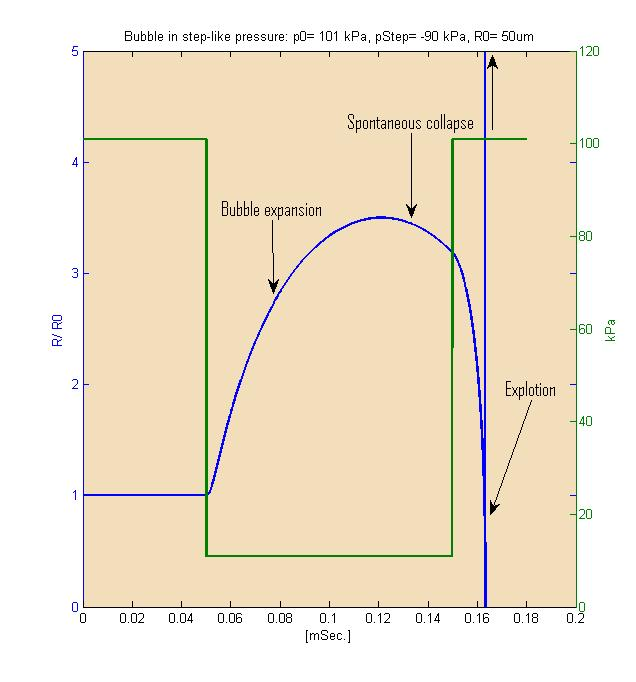
Numerical integration of RP eq. including surface tension and viscosity terms. Initially at rest in atmospheric pressure with R0=50 um, the bubble subjected to pressure-drop undergoes expansion and then collapses.

The Rayleigh–Plesset equation can be derived entirely from first principles using the bubble radius as the dynamic parameter. Consider a spherical bubble with time-dependent radius $R(t)$, where $t$ is time. Assume that the bubble contains a homogeneously distributed vapor/gas with a uniform temperature $T_B(t)$ and pressure $P_B(t)$. Outside the bubble is an infinite domain of liquid with constant density $\rho_L$ and dynamic viscosity $\mu_L$. Let the temperature and pressure far from the bubble be $T_\infty$ and $P_\infty(t)$. The temperature $T_\infty$ is assumed to be constant. At a radial distance $r$ from the center of the bubble, the varying liquid properties are pressure $P(r,t)$, temperature $T(r,t)$, and radially outward velocity $u(r,t)$. Note that these liquid properties are only defined outside the bubble, for $r \ge R(t)$.

=== Mass conservation ===
By conservation of mass, the inverse-square law requires that the radially outward velocity $u(r,t)$ must be inversely proportional to the square of the distance from the origin (the center of the bubble). Therefore, letting $F(t)$ be some function of time,

$$u(r,t) = \frac{F(t)}{r^2}$$

In the case of zero mass transport across the bubble surface, the velocity at the interface must be

$$u(R,t) = \frac{dR}{dt} = \frac{F(t)}{R^2}$$

which gives that

$$F(t) = R^2dR/dt$$

In the case where mass transport occurs and assuming the bubble contents are at constant density, the rate of mass increase inside the bubble is given by

$$\frac{dm_V}{dt} = \rho_V\frac{dV}{dt} = \rho_V\frac{d(4\pi R^3/3)}{dt} = 4\pi\rho_VR^2\frac{dR}{dt}$$

with $V$ being the volume of the bubble. If $u_L$ is the velocity of the liquid relative to the bubble at $r = R$, then the mass entering the bubble is given by

$$\frac{dm_L}{dt} = \rho_LAu_L = \rho_L(4\pi R^2)u_L$$

with $A$ being the surface area of the bubble. Now by conservation of mass $dm_v/dt = dm_L/dt$, therefore $u_L = (\rho_V/\rho_L)dR/dt$. Hence

$$u(R,t) = \frac{dR}{dt} - u_L = \frac{dR}{dt} - \frac{\rho_V}{\rho_L}\frac{dR}{dt} = \left(1-\frac{\rho_V}{\rho_L}\right)\frac{dR}{dt}$$

Therefore

$$F(t) = \left(1-\frac{\rho_V}{\rho_L}\right)R^2\frac{dR}{dt}$$

In many cases, the liquid density is much greater than the vapor density, $\rho_L \gg \rho_V$, so that $F(t)$ can be approximated by the original zero mass transfer form $F(t) = R^2dR/dt$, so that

$$u(r,t) = \frac{F(t)}{r^2} = \frac{R^2}{r^2}\frac{dR}{dt}$$

=== Momentum conservation ===
Assuming that the liquid is a Newtonian fluid, the incompressible Navier–Stokes equation in spherical coordinates for motion in the radial direction gives

$$\rho_L\left(\frac{\partial u}{\partial t} + u\frac{\partial u}{\partial r}\right) = -\frac{\partial P}{\partial r} + \mu_L \left[ \frac{1}{r^2}\frac{\partial}{\partial r}\left( r^2\frac{\partial u}{\partial r}\right) - \frac{2u}{r^2}\right]$$

Substituting kinematic viscosity $\nu_L = \mu_L/\rho_L$ and rearranging gives

$$-\frac{1}{\rho_L}\frac{\partial P}{\partial r} = \frac{\partial u}{\partial t} + u\frac{\partial u}{\partial r} - \nu_L \left[ \frac{1}{r^2}\frac{\partial}{\partial r}\left( r^2\frac{\partial u}{\partial r}\right) - \frac{2u}{r^2}\right]$$

whereby substituting $u(r,t)$ from mass conservation yields

$$-\frac{1}{\rho_L}\frac{\partial P}{\partial r} = \frac{2R}{r^2}\left(\frac{dR}{dt}\right)^2 + \frac{R^2}{r^2}\frac{d^2R}{dt^2} - \frac{2R^4}{r^5}\left(\frac{dR}{dt}\right)^2 = \frac{1}{r^2}\left(2R\left(\frac{dR}{dt}\right)^2 + R^2\frac{d^2R}{dt^2}\right) - \frac{2R^4}{r^5}\left(\frac{dR}{dt}\right)^2$$

Note that the viscous terms cancel during substitution. Separating variables and integrating from the bubble boundary $r = R$ to $r \rightarrow \infty$ gives

$$-\frac{1}{\rho_L}\int_{P(R)}^{P(\infty)} dP = \int_R^\infty \left[ \frac{1}{r^2}\left(2R\left(\frac{dR}{dt}\right)^2 + R^2\frac{d^2R}{dt^2}\right) - \frac{2R^4}{r^5}\left(\frac{dR}{dt}\right)^2 \right] dr$$

$${ \frac{P(R) - P_\infty}{\rho_L} = \left[- \frac{1}{r}\left(2R\left(\frac{dR}{dt}\right)^2 + R^2\frac{d^2R}{dt^2}\right) + \frac{R^4}{2r^4}\left(\frac{dR}{dt}\right)^2 \right]_R^\infty = R\frac{d^2R}{dt^2} + \frac{3}{2}\left(\frac{dR}{dt}\right)^2 }$$

=== Boundary conditions ===
Let $\sigma_{rr}$ be the normal stress in the liquid that points radially outward from the center of the bubble. In spherical coordinates, for a fluid with constant density and constant viscosity,

$$\sigma_{rr} = -P +2\mu_L\frac{\partial u}{\partial r}$$

Therefore at some small portion of the bubble surface, the net force per unit area acting on the lamina is

$$\begin{align}
\sigma_{rr}(R) + P_B - \frac{2\sigma}{R} & = -P(R) + \left.2\mu_L\frac{\partial u}{\partial r}\right|_{r=R} + P_B - \frac{2\sigma}{R} \\
& = -P(R) + 2\mu_L\frac{\partial}{\partial r}\left( \frac{R^2}{r^2}\frac{dR}{dt} \right)_{r=R} + P_B - \frac{2\sigma}{R} \\
& = -P(R) - \frac{4\mu_L}{R}\frac{dR}{dt} + P_B - \frac{2\sigma}{R} \\
\end{align}$$

where $\sigma$ is the surface tension. If there is no mass transfer across the boundary, then this force per unit area must be zero, therefore

$P(R) = P_B - \frac{4\mu_L}{R}\frac{dR}{dt} - \frac{2\sigma}{R}$

and so the result from momentum conservation becomes

$$\frac{P(R) - P_\infty}{\rho_L} = \frac{P_B - P_\infty}{\rho_L} - \frac{4\mu_L}{\rho_LR}\frac{dR}{dt} - \frac{2\sigma }{\rho_LR} = R\frac{d^2R}{dt^2} + \frac{3}{2}\left(\frac{dR}{dt}\right)^2$$

whereby rearranging and letting $\nu_L = \mu_L/\rho_L$ gives the Rayleigh–Plesset equation

$$\frac{P_B(t) - P_\infty(t)}{\rho_L} = R\frac{d^2R}{dt^2} + \frac{3}{2}\left(\frac{dR}{dt}\right)^2 + \frac{4\nu_L}{R}\frac{dR}{dt} + \frac{2\sigma}{\rho_LR}$$

Using dot notation to represent derivatives with respect to time, the Rayleigh–Plesset equation can be more succinctly written as

$$\frac{P_B(t) - P_\infty(t)}{\rho_L} = R\ddot{R} + \frac{3}{2}(\dot{R})^2 + \frac{4\nu_L\dot{R}}{R} + \frac{2\sigma}{\rho_LR}$$

== Solutions ==
More recently, analytical closed-form solutions were found for the Rayleigh–Plesset equation for both an empty and gas-filled bubble and were generalized to the N-dimensional case. The case when the surface tension is present due to the effects of capillarity were also studied.

Also, for the special case where surface tension and viscosity are neglected, high-order analytical approximations are also known.

In the static case, the Rayleigh–Plesset equation simplifies, yielding the Young–Laplace equation:

$$P_B-P_\infty = \frac{2\sigma}{R}$$

When only infinitesimal periodic variations in the bubble radius and pressure are considered, the RP equation also yields the expression of the natural frequency of the bubble oscillation.
