= Ultrasonic cavitation device =

Surgical device using ultrasound to break up tissues

Ultrasonic cavitation device is a surgical device using low frequency ultrasound energy to dissect or fragment tissues with low fiber content. It is basically an ultrasound probe (acoustic vibrator) combined with an aspirator device (suction).

It is mainly used for tissues with high water content and low fiber content, like noncirrhotic liver and pancreas. It has advantages of less blood loss, improved visibility and less collateral tissue damage. It is used in number of surgical procedures such as resection of small endocrine pancreatic tumours, partial nephrectomy, salvage splenectomy, head and neck procedures and gynecological tumours.

== See also ==
- Instruments used in general surgery
