= Evolution from Francis turbine to Kaplan turbine =

Evolution of water turbine

The Francis turbine converts energy at high heads which are often not available; hence, a turbine was required to convert energy at low heads, given a sufficiently large quantity of water. It was easy to convert high heads to power easily but difficult to do so for low-pressure heads. Therefore, an evolution took place that converted the Francis turbine to the Kaplan turbine, which generates power at even low heads efficiently.

== Changes ==
Turbines are sometimes differentiated according to the type of inlet flow, whether the inlet velocity is in an axial direction, radial direction, or a combination of both. The Francis turbine is a mixed turbine (the inlet velocity has radial and tangential components) while the Kaplan turbine is an axial turbine (the inlet velocity is purely axial). The evolution mainly consisted of the change in the inlet flow.

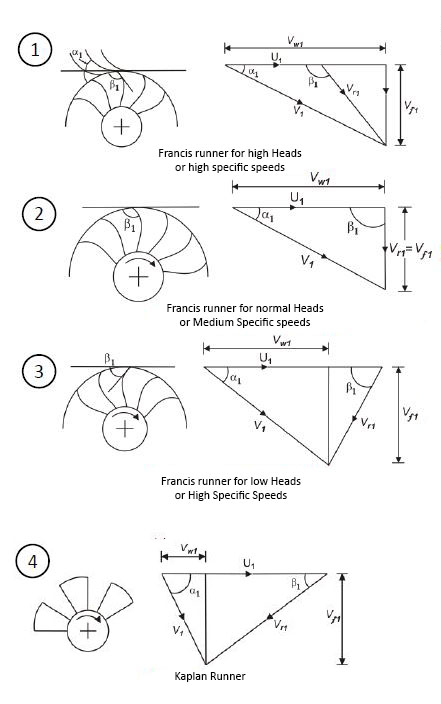
The image describes the changes in velocity triangles on decreasing the specific speed or decreasing the pressure head, and finally shows the evolution from the Francis hydraulic turbine to the Kaplan hydraulic turbine.

Nomenclature of a velocity triangle:

A general velocity triangle consists of the following vectors:

- V: Absolute velocity of the fluid.
- U: Tangential velocity of the fluid.
- V_{r}: Relative velocity of the fluid after contact with rotor.
- V_{w}: Tangential component of V (absolute velocity), called whirl velocity.
- V_{f}: Flow velocity (the axial component in the case of axial machines, the radial in the case of radial).
- α: Angle made by V with the plane of the machine (usually the nozzle angle or the guide blade angle).
- β: Angle of the rotor blade or angle made by relative velocity with the tangential direction.

Generally, the Kaplan turbine works on low heads (H) and high flow rates (Q). This implies that the specific speed (N_{s}) on which a Kaplan turbine functions is high, as specific speed (N_{sp}) is directly proportional to flow (Q) and inversely proportional to head (H). On the other hand, the Francis turbine works on high specific speeds and low heads.

In the figure, it can be seen that the increase in specific speed (or decrease in head) has the following consequences:

- A reduction in inlet velocity V_{1}.
- The flow velocity V_{f1} at the inlet increases, and hence allows a large amount of fluid to enter the turbine.
- V_{w} decreases as moving to the Kaplan turbine, and here in the figure, V_{f} represents the axial (V_{a}) component.
- The flow at the inlet, in the figure, to all the runners, except the Kaplan impeller, is in the radial (V_{f}) and tangential (V_{w}) directions.
- β_{1} decreases as the evolution proceeds.
- However, the exit velocity is axial in a Kaplan runner, while it is radial in all other runners.

Hence, these are the parameter changes that have to be incorporated in converting a Francis turbine to a Kaplan turbine.

== General differences between Francis and Kaplan turbines ==
- The efficiency of a Kaplan turbine is higher than that of a Francis turbine.
- A Kaplan turbine has a smaller cross-section and has lower rotational speed than a Francis turbine.
- In a Kaplan turbine, the water flows in axially and out axially, while in a Francis turbine it flows in radially and out axially.
- A Kaplan turbine has fewer runner blades than a Francis turbine because a Kaplan turbine's blades are twisted and cover a larger circumference.
- Friction losses in a Kaplan turbine are less.
- The shaft of a Francis turbine is usually vertical (in many of the early machines it was horizontal), whereas in a Kaplan turbine it is always vertical.
- A Francis turbine's specific speed is medium (60–300 RPM); a Kaplan turbine's specific speed is high (300–1000 RPM).

== See also ==
- Francis turbine
- Kaplan turbine
- Velocity triangle
- Turbine
- Three-dimensional losses and correlation in turbomachinery
