= Radial turbine =

Type of turbine

A radial turbine is a turbine in which the flow of the working fluid is radial to the shaft. The difference between axial and radial turbines consists in the way the fluid flows through the components (compressor and turbine). Whereas for an axial turbine the rotor is 'impacted' by the fluid flow, for a radial turbine, the flow is smoothly oriented perpendicular to the rotation axis, and it drives the turbine in the same way water drives a watermill. The result is less mechanical stress (and less thermal stress, in case of hot working fluids) which enables a radial turbine to be simpler, more robust, and more efficient (in a similar power range) when compared to axial turbines. When it comes to high power ranges (above 5 MW) the radial turbine is no longer competitive (due to its heavy and expensive rotor) and the efficiency becomes similar to that of the axial turbines.

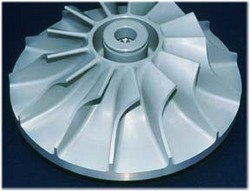
Radial turbine

== Advantages and challenges ==
Compared to an axial flow turbine, a radial turbine can employ a relatively higher pressure ratio (≈4) per stage with lower flow rates. Thus these machines fall in the lower specific speed and power ranges. For high temperature applications rotor blade cooling in radial stages is not as easy as in axial turbine stages. Variable angle nozzle blades can give higher stage efficiencies in a radial turbine stage even at off-design point operation. In the family of water turbines, the Francis turbine is a very well-known IFR turbine which generates much greater power with a relatively large impeller.

== Components of radial turbines ==
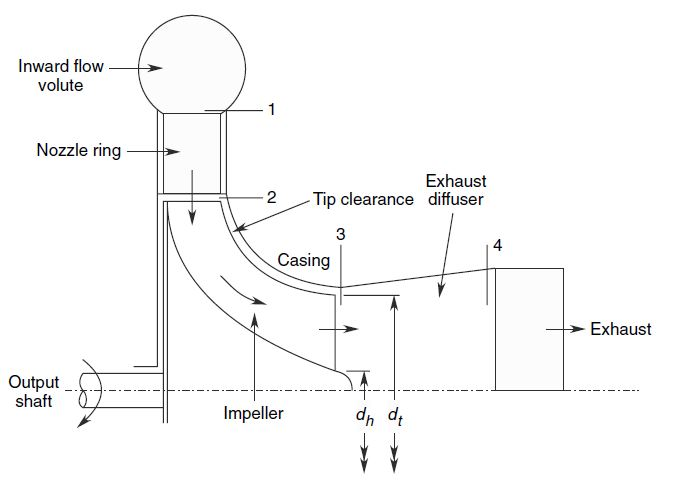
Ninety degree inward-flow radial turbine stage

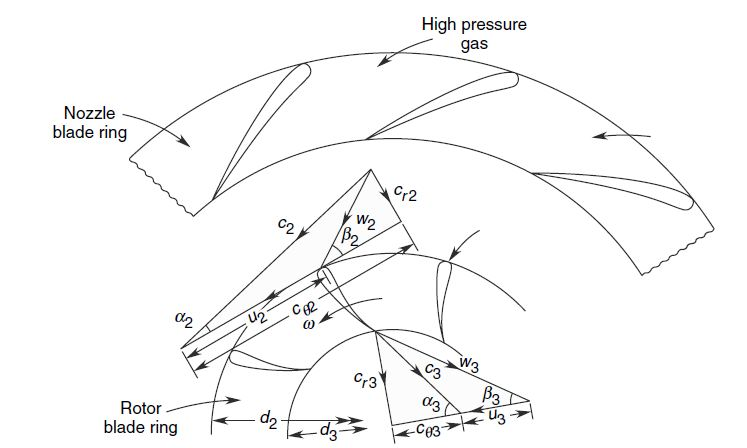
Velocity triangles for an inward-flow radial (IFR) turbine stage with cantilever blades

The radial and tangential components of the absolute velocity c_{2} are c_{r2} and c_{q2}, respectively. The relative velocity of the flow and the peripheral speed of the rotor are w_{2} and u_{2} respectively. The air angle at the rotor blade entry is given by

$$\,\tan{\beta_2} =\frac{c_{r2}}{c_{\theta 2} - u_2}$$

== Enthalpy and entropy diagram ==
The stagnation state of the gas at the nozzle entry is represented by point 01. The gas expands adiabatically in the nozzles from a pressure p_{1} to p_{2} with an increase in its velocity from c_{1} to c_{2}. Since this is an energy transformation process, the stagnation enthalpy remains constant but the stagnation pressure decreases (p_{01} > p_{02}) due to losses. The energy transfer accompanied by an energy transformation process occurs in the rotor.

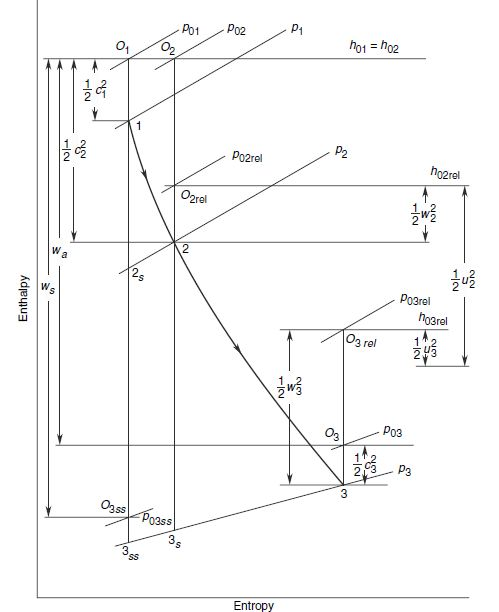
Enthalpy-entropy diagram for flow through an IFR turbine stage

== Spouting velocity ==
A reference velocity (c_{0}) known as the isentropic velocity, spouting velocity or stage terminal velocity is defined as that velocity which will be obtained during an isentropic expansion of the gas between the entry and exit pressures of the stage.

$$\,C_0 = \sqrt{2C_p\,T_{01}\,\left(1 - \left(\frac{p_3}{p_{01}}\right)^\frac{\gamma - 1}{\gamma}\right)}$$

== Stage efficiency ==
The total-to-static efficiency is based on this value of work.

$$\begin{align}
\eta_\text{ts} &= \frac{h_{01} - h_{03}}{h_{01} - h_{3ss}}
= \frac{\psi\,u_2^2}{C_p\,T_{01}\left(1 - \left(\frac{p_3}{p_{01}}\right)^\frac{\gamma - 1}{\gamma}\right)}
\end{align}$$

== Degree of reaction ==
The relative pressure or enthalpy drop in the nozzle and rotor blades are determined by the degree of reaction of the stage. This is defined by

$$R = \frac{\text{static enthalpy drop in rotor}}{\text{stagnation enthalpy drop in stage}}$$

The two quantities within the parentheses in the numerator may have the same or opposite signs. This, besides other factors, would also govern the value of reaction. The stage reaction decreases as C_{θ2} increases because this results in a large proportion of the stage enthalpy drop to occur in the nozzle ring.

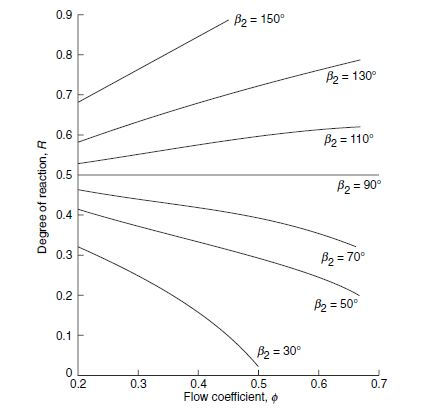
Variation of the degree of reaction with flow coefficient and air angle at rotor entry

== Stage losses ==
The stage work is less than the isentropic stage enthalpy drop on account of aerodynamic losses in the stage. The actual output at the turbine shaft is equal to the stage work minus the losses due to rotor disc and bearing friction.

1. Skin friction and separation losses in the scroll and nozzle ring
  They depend on the geometry and the coefficient of skin friction of these components.
2. Skin friction and separation losses in the rotor blade channels
  These losses are also governed by the channel geometry, coefficient of skin friction and the ratio of the relative velocities w_{3}/w_{2}. In the ninety degree IFR turbine stage, the losses occurring in the radial and axial sections of the rotor are sometimes separately considered.
3. Skin friction and separation losses in the diffuser
  These are mainly governed by the geometry of the diffuser and the rate of diffusion.
4. Secondary losses
  These are due to circulatory flows developing into the various flow passages and are principally governed by the aerodynamic loading of the blades. The main parameters governing these losses are b_{2}/d_{2}, d_{3}/d_{2} and hub-tip ratio at the rotor exit.
5. Shock or incidence losses
  At off-design operation, there are additional losses in the nozzle and rotor blade rings on account of incidence at the leading edges of the blades. This loss is conventionally referred to as shock loss though it has nothing to do with the shock waves.
6. Tip clearance loss
  This is due to the flow over the rotor blade tips which does not contribute to the energy transfer.

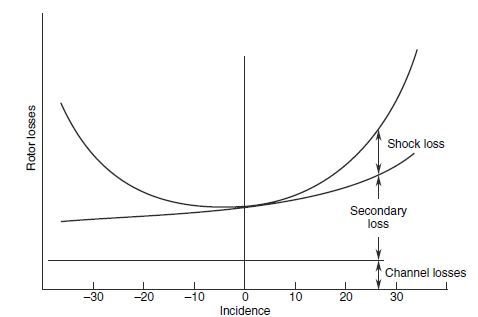
Losses in the rotor of an IFR turbine stage

== Blade to gas speed ratio ==
The blade-to-gas speed ratio can be expressed in terms of the isentropic stage terminal velocity c_{0}.

$$\,\sigma_s = \frac{u_2}{c_0} = [2 (1 + \phi_2 \cot{\beta_2})]^{-\frac{1}{2}}$$

for

β_{2} = 90^{o}
σ_{s} ≈ 0.707

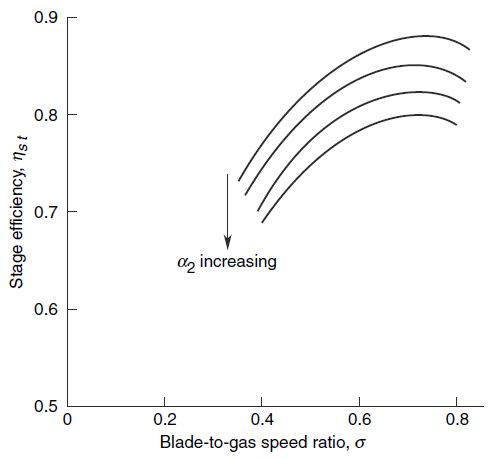
Variation of stage efficiency of an IFR turbine with blade-to-isentropic gas speed ratio

== Outward-flow radial stages ==
In outward flow radial turbine stages, the flow of the gas or steam occurs from smaller to larger diameters. The stage consists of a pair of fixed and moving blades. The increasing area of cross-section at larger diameters accommodates the expanding gas.

This configuration did not become popular with the steam and gas turbines. The only one which is employed more commonly is the Ljungstrom double rotation type turbine. It consists of rings of cantilever blades projecting from two discs rotating in opposite directions. The relative peripheral velocity of blades in two adjacent rows, with respect to each other, is high. This gives a higher value of enthalpy drop per stage.

== Nikola Tesla's bladeless radial turbine ==
In the early 1900s, Nikola Tesla developed and patented his bladeless Tesla turbine. One of the difficulties with bladed turbines is the complex and highly precise requirements for balancing and manufacturing the bladed rotor which has to be very well balanced. The blades are subject to corrosion and cavitation. Tesla attacked this problem by substituting a series of closely spaced disks for the blades of the rotor. The working fluid flows between the disks and transfers its energy to the rotor by means of the boundary layer effect or adhesion and viscosity rather than by impulse or reaction. Tesla stated his turbine could realize incredibly high efficiencies by steam. There has been no documented evidence of Tesla turbines achieving the efficiencies Tesla claimed. They have been found to have low overall efficiencies in the role of a turbine or pump. In recent decades there has been further research into bladeless turbine and development of patented designs that work with corrosive/abrasive and hard to pump material such as ethylene glycol, fly ash, blood, rocks, and even live fish.
