= Axial-flow pump =

Type of pump consisting of a propeller in a pipe

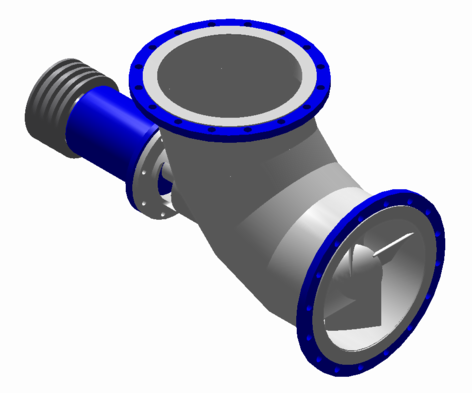
An axial-flow pump for industrial use

An axial-flow pump, or AFP, is a common type of pump that essentially consists of a propeller (an axial impeller) in a pipe. The propeller can be driven directly by a sealed motor in the pipe or by electric motor or petrol/diesel engines mounted to the pipe from the outside or by a right-angle drive shaft that pierces the pipe.

Fluid particles, in course of their flow through the pump, do not change their radial locations since the change in radius at the entry (called 'suction') and the exit (called 'discharge') of the pump is very small. Hence the name "axial" pump.

== Operation ==
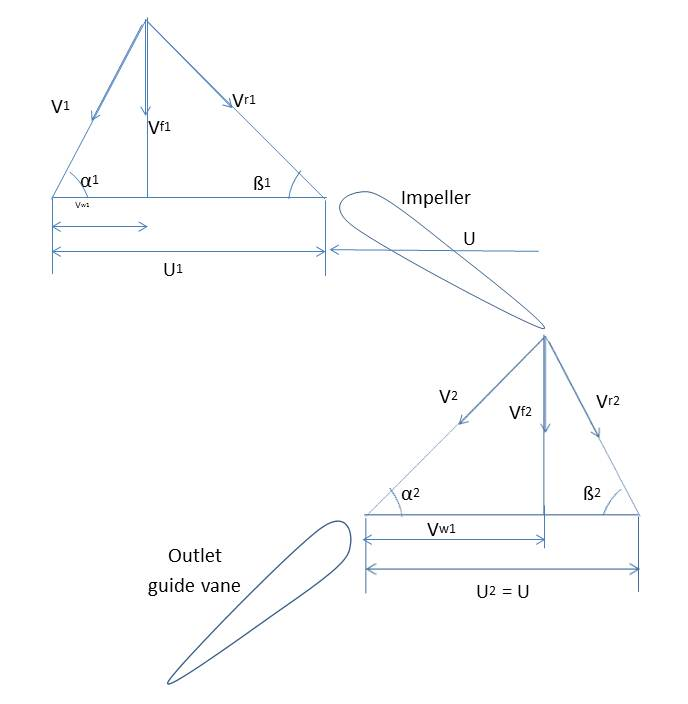
The velocity triangle for an axial flow pump

An axial flow pump has a propeller-type of impeller running in a casing. The pressure in an axial flow pump is developed by the flow of liquid over the blades of impeller. The fluid is pushed in a direction parallel to the shaft of the impeller, that is, fluid particles, in course of their flow through the pump, do not change their radial locations. It allows the fluid to enter the impeller axially and discharge the fluid nearly axially. The propeller of an axial flow pump is driven by a motor.

=== Notes ===
- The fixed diffuser vanes are used to remove the whirl component ($V_{\rm w2}$) of the discharge velocity of the impeller and to convert the energy to pressure.
- The impeller vanes may be adjustable.
- The machine may be fitted with pre-entry vanes to eliminate pre-rotation and to make the flow purely axial.

Work done on the fluid per unit weight = $U \frac{(V_{\rm w2}-V_{\rm w1})} {g}$

where $U = U_{\rm 2} = U_{\rm 1}$ is the blade velocity.

For maximum energy transfer, $V_{\rm w1} = 0$, that is, $\alpha_{\rm 1} = 90^\circ$

Therefore, from outlet velocity triangle, we have

$$V_{\rm w2} = U - V_{\rm f2} \cot \beta_{\rm 2}$$

Therefore, the maximum energy transfer per unit weight by an axial flow pump = $U \frac{(U - V_{\rm f2} \cot \beta_{\rm 2})} {g}$

== Blade design ==
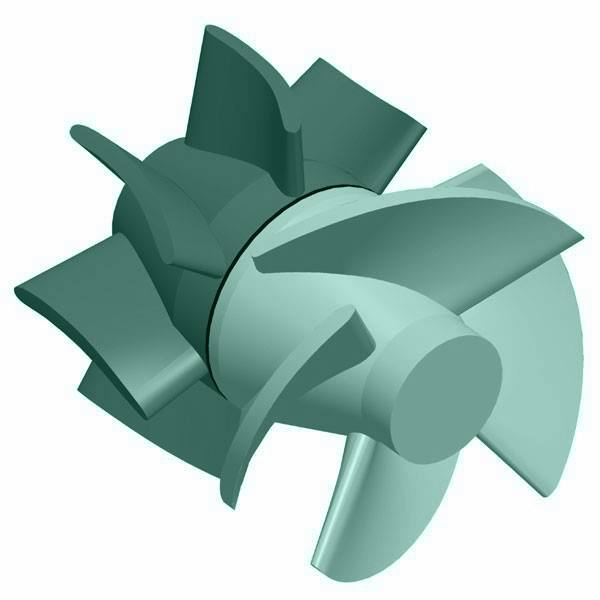
The blades of an axial flow pump are twisted

In an axial flow pump, blades have an airfoil section over which the fluid flows and pressure is developed. For a constant flow, we have $V_{\rm f1} = V_{\rm f2} = V_{\rm f}$

So, the maximum energy transfer to the fluid per unit weight will be

$$U \frac{(U - V_{\rm f} \cot \beta_{\rm 2})} {g}$$

For constant energy transfer over the entire span of the blade, the above equation should be constant for all values of $r$. But, $U^2$ will increase with an increase in radius $r$, therefore to maintain a constant value an equal increase in $UV_{\rm f} \cot \beta_{\rm 2}$ must take place. Since, $V_{\rm f}$ is constant, therefore $\cot \beta_{\rm 2}$ must increase on increasing $r$. So, the blade is twisted as the radius changes.

== Characteristics ==
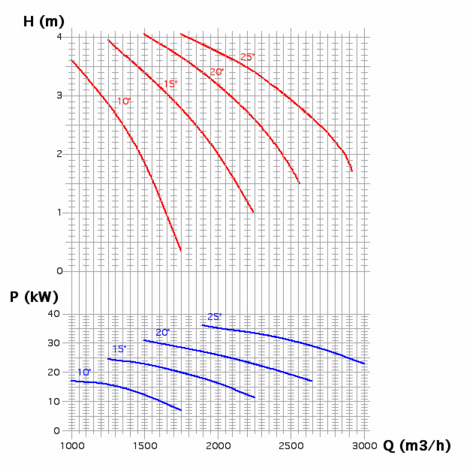
Characteristic curve of an axial-flow pump. Red lines show the different performance at varying blade pitch, blue lines the absorbed power.

The characteristics of an axial flow pump are shown in the figure. As shown in the figure, the head at the zero flow rate can be as much as three times the head at the pump's best efficiency point. Also, the power requirement increases as the flow decreases, with the highest power drawn at the zero flow rate. This characteristic is opposite to that of a centrifugal pump where power requirement increases with an increase in the flow. Also the power requirements and pump head increases with an increase in pitch, thus allowing the pump to adjust according to the system conditions to provide the most efficient operation.

== Advantages ==
The main advantage of an axial flow pump is that it has a relatively high discharge (flow rate) at a relatively low head (vertical distance). For example, it can pump up to 3 times more water and other fluids at lifts of less than 4 meters as compared to the more common radial-flow or centrifugal pump. It also can easily be adjusted to run at peak efficiency at low-flow/high-pressure and high-flow/low-pressure by changing the pitch on the propeller (some models only).

The effect of turning of the fluid is not too severe in an axial pump and the length of the impeller blades is also short. This leads to lower hydrodynamic losses and higher stage efficiencies. These pumps have the smallest of the dimensions among many of the conventional pumps and are more suited for low heads and higher discharges.

== Applications ==
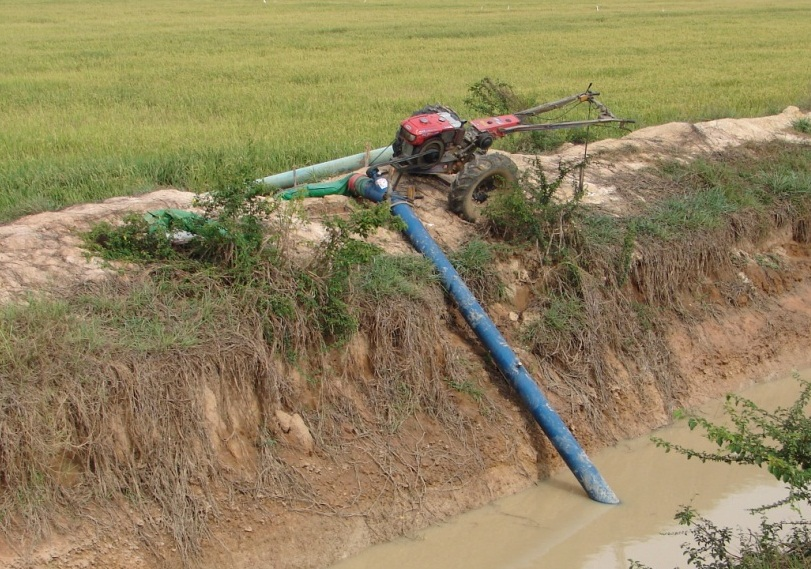
Thai model 8 inch × 20 foot long axial flow pump powered by 12 horsepower two-wheel tractor lifting water from an irrigation canal into nearby rice fields via plastic flexible delivery pipe

One of the most common applications of AFPs would be in handling sewage from commercial, municipal and industrial sources.

In sailboats, AFPs are also used in transfer pumps used for sailing ballast. In power plants, they are used for pumping water from a reservoir, river, lake or sea for cooling the main condenser. In the chemical industry, they are used for the circulation of large masses of liquid, such as in evaporators and crystallizers. In sewage treatment, an AFP is often used for internal mixed liquor recirculation (i.e. transferring nitrified mixed liquor from aeration zone to denitrification zone).

In agriculture and fisheries very large horsepower AFPs are used to lift water for irrigation and drainage. In East Asia, millions of smaller horsepower (6-20 HP) mobile units are powered mostly by single cylinder diesel and petrol engines. They are used by smaller farmers for crop irrigation, drainage and fisheries. Impeller designs have improved as well bringing even more efficiency and reducing energy costs to farming there. Earlier designs were less than two meters long but nowadays they can be up to 6 meters or more to enable them to more safely "reach out" to the water source while allowing the power source (many times two-wheel tractors are used) to be kept in safer, more stable positions, as shown in the adjacent picture.

== See also ==
- Pump
- Specific Speed
- Axial compressor
- Roots blower

== Bibliography ==
- SM Yahya "Turbines Compressors and Fans, 3rd edition", Tata McGraw-Hill Education, 2005
- A Valan Arasu "Turbo Machines, 2nd edition", Vikas Publishing House Pvt. Ltd.
