= Turbine map =

Each turbine in a gas turbine engine has an operating map. Complete maps are either based on turbine rig test results or are predicted by a special computer program. Alternatively, the map of a similar turbine can be suitably scaled.

== Description ==
A turbine map shows lines of percent corrected speed (based on a reference value) plotted against the x-axis which is pressure ratio, but deltaH/T (roughly proportional to temperature drop across the unit/component entry temperature) is also often used. The y-axis is some measure of flow, usually non-dimensional flow or corrected flow, but not actual flow. Sometimes, the axes of a turbine map are transposed, to be consistent with those of a compressor map. As in this case, a companion plot, showing the variation of isentropic (i.e. adiabatic) or polytropic efficiency, is often also included.

The turbine may be a transonic unit, where the throat Mach number reaches sonic conditions and the turbine becomes truly choked. Consequently, there is virtually no variation in flow between the corrected speed lines at high pressure ratios.

Most turbines however, are subsonic devices, the highest Mach number at the NGV throat being about 0.85. Under these conditions, there is a slight scatter in flow between the percent corrected speed lines in the 'choked' region of the map, where the flow for a given speed reaches a plateau.

Unlike a compressor or fan, surge or stall does not occur in a turbine. This is because the gas flows through the turbine in its natural direction, from high to low pressure. As a result, there is no surge line marked on a turbine map.

Working lines are difficult to see on a conventional turbine map because the speed lines bunch up. The map may be replotted, with the y-axis being the multiple of flow and corrected speed. This separates the speed lines, enabling working lines (and efficiency contours) to be cross-plotted and clearly seen.

== Progressive unchoking of the expansion system ==
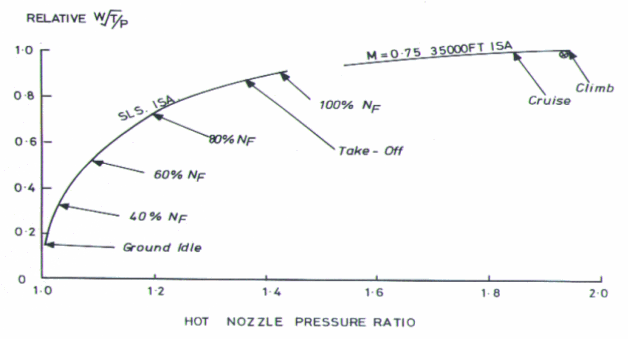
Typical primary nozzle map

The following discussion relates to the expansion system of a 2-spool, high bypass ratio, unmixed, turbofan.

On the RHS is a typical primary (i.e. hot) nozzle map (or characteristic). Its appearance is similar to that of a turbine map, but it lacks any (rotational) speed lines. Note that at high flight speeds (ignoring the change in altitude), the hot nozzle is usually in, or close to, a choking condition. This is because the ram rise in the air intake factors-up the nozzle pressure ratio. At static (e.g. SLS) conditions there is no ram rise, so the nozzle tends to operate unchoked (LHS of plot).

The low pressure turbine 'sees' the variation in flow capacity of the primary nozzle. A falling nozzle flow capacity tends to reduce the LP turbine pressure ratio (and deltaH/T). As the left hand map shows, initially the reduction in LP turbine deltaH/T has little effect upon the entry flow of the unit. Eventually, however, the LP turbine unchokes, causing the flow capacity of the LP turbine to start to decrease.

As long as the LP turbine remains choked, there is no significant change in HP turbine pressure ratio (or deltaH/T) and flow. Once, however, the LP turbine unchokes, the HP turbine deltaH/T starts to decrease. Eventually the HP turbine unchokes, causing its flow capacity to start to fall. Ground Idle is often reached shortly after HPT unchoke.
