= Draft tube =

Part of a turbine

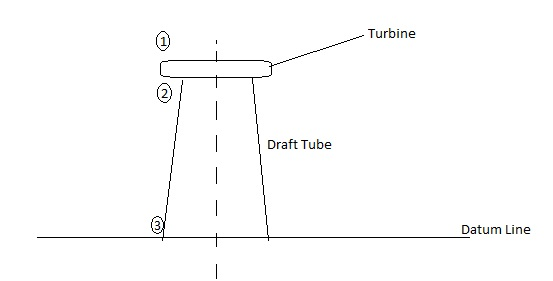
Draft tube installed above tail race

A draft tube is a diverging tube fitted at the exit of a turbine's runner and used to utilize the kinetic energy available with water at the exit of the runner.

This draft tube at the end of the turbine increases the pressure of the exiting fluid at the expense of its velocity. This means that the turbine can reduce pressure to a higher extent without fear of back flow from the tail race.

In an impulse turbine the available head is high and there is no significant effect on the efficiency if the turbine is placed a couple of meters above the tail race. But in the case of reaction turbines, if the net head is low and if the turbine is installed above the tail race, there can be appreciable loss in available pressure head to power the turbine. Also, if the pressure of the fluid in the tail race is higher than at the exit of the turbine, a back flow of liquid into the turbine can result in significant damage.

By placing a draft tube (also called a diffuser tube or pipe) at the exit of the turbine, the turbine pressure head is increased by decreasing the exit velocity, and both the overall efficiency and the output of the turbine can be improved. The draft tube works by converting some of the kinetic energy at the exit of the turbine runner into the useful pressure energy.

Using a draft tube also has the advantages of placing the turbine structure above the tail race so that any required inspections can be made more easily and reducing the amount of excavation required for construction.

== Efficiency ==
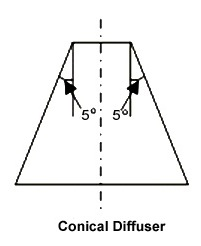
Conical draft tube

The efficiency of a draft tube is defined as the ratio of the actual conversion of kinetic energy into pressure energy in the draft tube to the kinetic energy available at the draft tube inlet.

ɳ = Difference of kinetic energy between inlet and outlet-tube losses/Kinetic Energy at the inlet.

ɳ_{dt} = :$\frac {(V_{2}^2-V_{3}^2)-2gh_{d}}{V_{2}^2}$

V_{2} = Fluids velocity at inlet of draft tube or at the outlet of turbine

V_{3} = Fluids velocity at outlet of draft tube

g= gravitational acceleration

h_{d} = head losses in draft tube

A draft tube allows a turbine to be placed above the tail race and simultaneously allows it to operate at the same efficiency as if it was placed at the tail race.

== Draft tube and cavitation ==
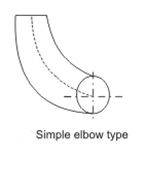
simple elbow draft tube

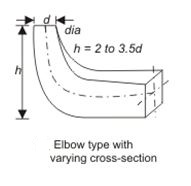
Elbow type with rectangular cross section

Cavitation occurs when the local absolute pressure falls below the saturated vapor pressure of the water for the water temperature. The height of draft tube is an important parameter for avoiding cavitation. Applying Bernoulli's equation between the outlet of the runner and the discharge point of the draft tube (neglecting any head losses in draft tube):

$$z_{2}\, +\, \frac{p_{2}}{\rho g}\, +\, \frac{V_{2}^2}{2\,g}\, =\, z_{3}\, +\, \frac{p_{3}}{\rho g}\, +\, \frac{V_{3}^2}{2\,g},$$

z_{2} = z (Height of draft tube)

z_{3} = height of tail race which is referenced as datum line (=0)

p_{2} = pressure at the outlet of the runner

p_{3} = gauge pressure

$$\frac{p_{2}}{\rho g}\, =\, -\, \left[z\, +\, \frac{V_{2}^2-V_{3}^2}{2\,g}\right]\,$$

Because a draft tube is a diffuser, V_{3} is always less than V_{2}, which implies that p_{2} is always negative, thus the height of the draft tube is an important parameter to avoid cavitation.

== Types of draft tube ==
1. Conical diffuser or straight divergent tube – This type of draft tube consists of a conical diffuser with half angle generally less than equal to 10° to prevent flow separation. It is usually employed for low specific speed, vertical shaft francis turbine. Efficiency of this type of draft tube is 90%
2. Simple elbow type draft Tube – It consists of an extended elbow type tube. Generally, used when turbine has to be placed close to the tail-race. It helps to cut down the cost of excavation and the exit diameter should be as large as possible to recover kinetic energy at the outlet of runner. Efficiency of this kind of draft tube is less almost 60%
3. Elbow with varying cross section – It is similar to the Bent Draft tube except the bent part is of varying cross section with rectangular outlet.the horizontal portion of draft tube is generally inclined upwards to prevent entry of air from the exit end.
