= Axial turbine =

Turbine in which working fluid flows parallel to the shaft

In turbomachinery, an axial turbine is a turbine in which the flow of the working fluid is parallel to the shaft, as opposed to radial turbines, where the fluid runs around a shaft, as in a watermill. An axial turbine has a similar construction as an axial compressor, but it operates in the reverse, converting flow of the fluid into rotating mechanical energy.

A set of static guide vanes or nozzle vanes accelerates and adds swirl to the fluid and directs it to the next row of turbine blades mounted on a turbine rotor.

== Stage velocity triangle ==
The angles in the absolute system are noted by alpha (α) and the angles in the relative system are noted by beta (β). Axial and tangential components of both absolute and relative velocities are shown in the figure. Static and stagnation values of pressure and enthalpy in the absolute and relative systems are also shown.

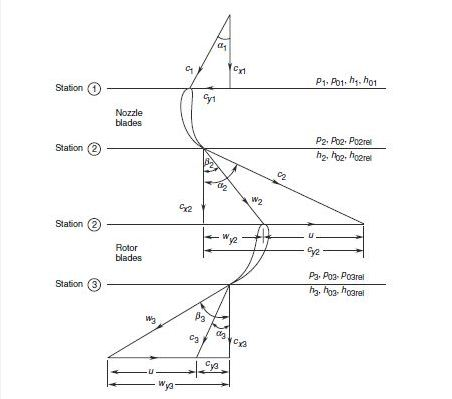
Velocity triangle for a turbine stage

It is often assumed that the axial velocity component remains constant through the stage. From this condition we get:
$$c_x = c_1\cos \alpha_1 = c_2\cos \alpha_2 = w_2\cos \beta_2 = c_3\cos \alpha_3 = w_3\cos \beta_3$$
Also, for constant axial velocity yields a useful relation:
$$\tan \alpha_2 +\tan \alpha_3 =\tan \beta_2 +\tan \beta_3$$

== Single impulse stage ==
A single-stage impulse turbine is shown in Figure

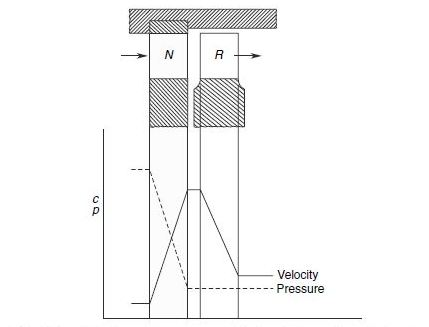
Single-stage impulse turbine

There is no change in the static pressure through the rotor of an impulse machine. The variation of pressure and velocity of the fluid through the stage is also shown in Figure.

The absolute velocity of the fluid increases corresponding to the pressure drop through the nozzle blade row in which the only transformation of energy occurs. The transfer of energy occurs only across the rotor blade row. Therefore, the absolute fluid velocity decreases through this as shown in the figure. In the absence of any pressure drop through the rotor blades, the relative velocities at their entry and exit are the same for frictionless flow. To obtain this condition the rotor blade angles must be equal. Therefore, the utilization factor is given by

$$E = U \frac{(c_{y2} + c_{y3})}{\frac{1}{2} c_{2}}$$

== Velocity-compounded impulse turbine ==
When the pressure drop available is large, it cannot all be used in one turbine stage. A single-stage utilizing a large pressure drop will have an impractically high peripheral speed of its rotor. This would lead to either a larger diameter or a very high rotational speed. Therefore, machines with large pressure drops employ more than one stage.

One of the methods to employ multi-stage expansion in impulse turbines is to generate high-velocity of the fluid by causing it to expand through a large pressure drop in the nozzle blade row. This high-velocity fluid then transfers its energy in a number of stages by employing many rotor blade rows separated by rows of fixed guide blades. A velocity compounded impulse turbine is shown in the figure.

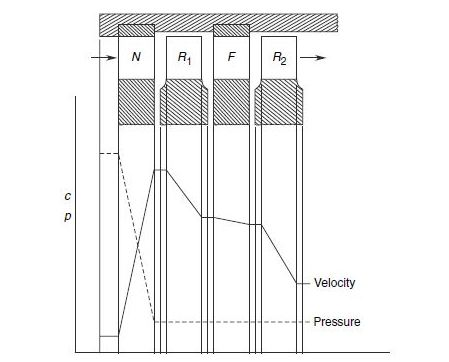
One-stage velocity-compounded impulse turbine - Curtis Turbine

The decrease in the absolute velocity of the fluid across the two rotor blade rows (R_{1} and R_{2}) is due to the energy transfer; the slight decrease in the fluid velocity through the fixed guide blades (F) is due to losses. Since the turbine is of the impulse type, the pressure of the fluid remains constant after its expansion in the nozzle blade row. Each stage is referred to as a velocity or Curtis stage, where each turbine (nozzle-moving blade-fix blade-moving blade) is counted as one stage.

== Multi stage pressure compounded impulse ==
There are two major problems in velocity-compounded stages:

- The nozzles have to be of the convergent-divergent type for generating high (supersonic) steam velocity. This results in a more expensive and difficult design of the nozzle blade rows.
- High velocity at the nozzle exit leads to higher cascade losses. Shock waves are generated if the flow is supersonic which further increase the losses.

To avoid these problems, another method of utilizing a ratio is employed in which the total pressure drop is divided into a number of impulse stages. These are known as pressure-compounded or Rateau stages. On account of the comparatively lower pressure drop, the nozzle blade rows are subsonic (M < 1). Therefore, such a stage does not suffer from the disabilities of the velocity stages.

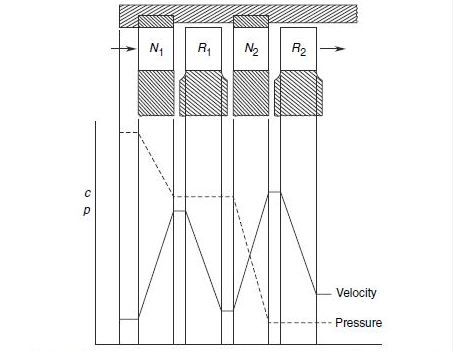
Two-stage pressure-compounded impulse turbine

Figure shows the variation of pressure and velocity of steam through the two pressure stages of an impulse turbine. The nozzle blades in each stage receive flow in the axial direction.

Some designers employ pressure stages up to the last stage. This gives a turbine of shorter length as compared to the reaction type, with a penalty on efficiency.

== Reaction stages ==
Figure shows two reaction stages and the variation of pressure and velocity of the gas in them. The gas pressure decreases continuously over both fixed and moving rows of blades. Since the pressure drop in each stage is smaller as compared to the impulse stages, the gas velocities are relatively low. Besides this the flow is accelerating throughout. These factors make the reaction stages aerodynamically more efficient though the tip leakage loss is increased on account of the relatively higher pressure difference across the rotor blades.

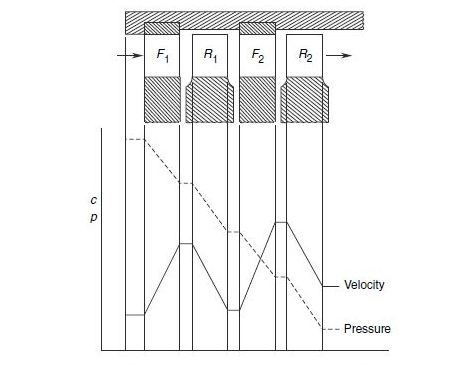
Two-stage reaction turbine

Multi-stage reaction turbines employ a large pressure drop by dividing it to smaller values in individual stages. Thus the reaction stages are like the pressure-compounded stages with a new element of “reaction” introduced in them, i.e. of accelerating the flow through rotor blade rows also.

== Blade-to-gas speed ratio ==
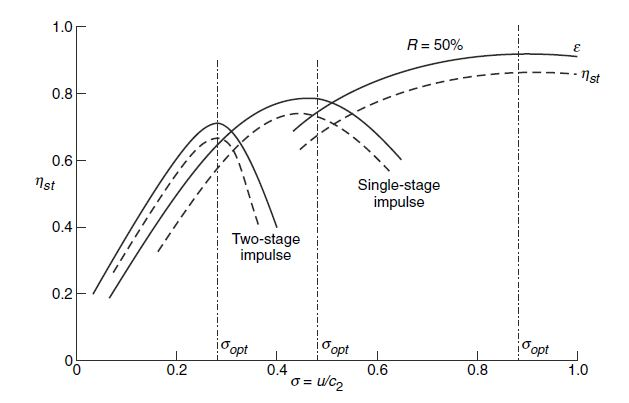
Variation of utilization factor and stage efficiency with blade-to-gas speed ratio

The blade-to-gas speed ratio parameter (velocity ratio) σ = u/c_{2}. Efficiencies of the turbine stages can also be plotted against this ratio. Such plots for some impulse and reaction stages are shown in the figure.

The performance of steam turbines is often presented in this form. The curves in Figure also show the optimum values of the velocity ratio and the range of off-design for various types of stages. The fifty per cent reaction stage shows a wider range. Another important aspect that is depicted here is that in applications where high gas velocities (due to high pressure ratio) are unavoidable, it is advisable to employ impulse stages to achieve practical and convenient values of the size and speed of the machine. Sometimes it is more convenient to use an isentropic velocity ratio. This is the ratio of the blade velocity and the isentropic gas velocity that would be obtained in its isentropic expansion through the stage pressure ratio.

== Losses and efficiencies ==
The losses occur in an actual turbine due to disc and bearing friction. Figure shows the energy flow diagram for the impulse stage of an axial turbine. Numbers in brackets indicate the order of energy or loss corresponding to 100 units of isentropic work (h_{01} – h_{03ss}).

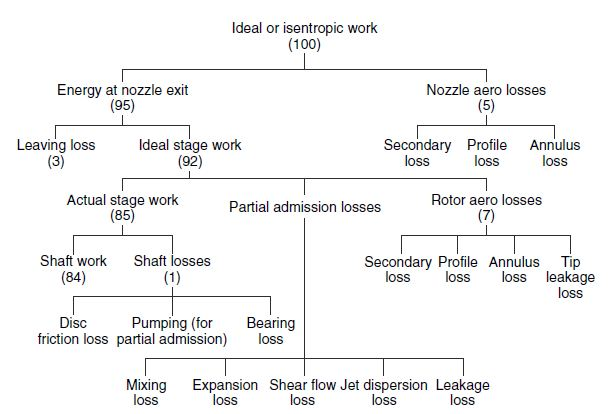
Energy flow diagram for the impulse stage of an axial turbine

It is seen that the energy reaching the shaft after accounting for stage cascade losses (nozzle and rotor blade aerodynamic losses) and leaving loss is about 85% of the ideal value; shaft losses are a negligible proportion of this value.

== See also ==
- Axial compressor
- Centrifugal compressor
