= Velocity triangle =

Diagram of the component velocities of a turbomachine's working fluid

In turbomachinery, a velocity triangle or a velocity diagram is a triangle representing the various components of velocities of the working fluid in a turbomachine. Velocity triangles may be drawn for both the inlet and outlet sections of any turbomachine. The vector nature of velocity is utilized in the triangles, and the most basic form of a velocity triangle consists of the tangential velocity, the absolute velocity and the relative velocity of the fluid making up three sides of the triangle.

== Components ==
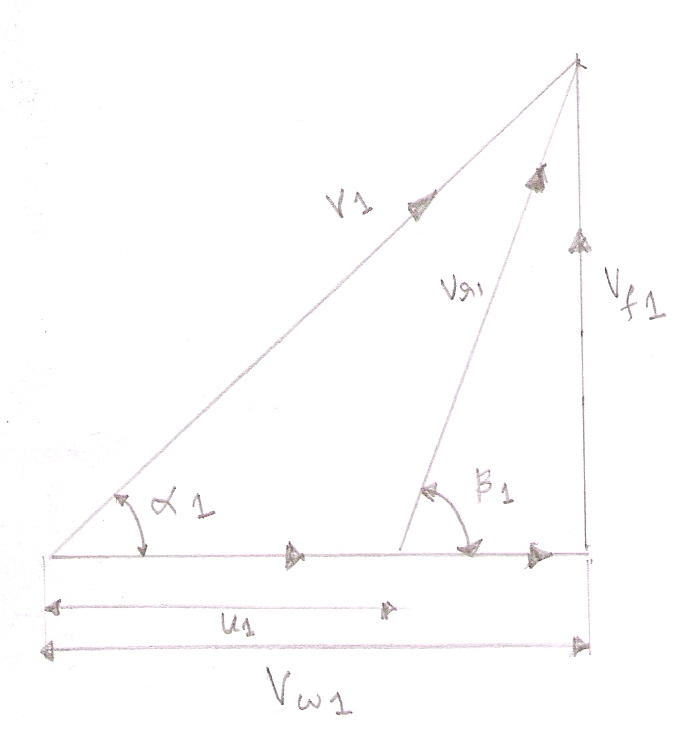
An example of a velocity triangle drawn for the inlet of a turbomachine. The "1" subscript denotes the high pressure side (inlet in case of turbines and outlet in case of pumps/compressors).

A general velocity triangle consists of the following vectors:

V = absolute velocity of the fluid.
U = blade linear velocity.
V_{r} = relative velocity of the fluid after contact with rotor.
V_{w} = tangential component of V (absolute velocity), called Whirl velocity.
V_{f} = flow velocity (axial component in case of axial machines, radial component in case of radial machines).

The following angles are encountered during the analysis:

α = absolute angle is an angle made by V with the plane of the machine (usually the nozzle angle or the guide blade angle) i.e. angle made by absolute velocity V and the direction of blade rotation U.
β = relative angle is an angle made by relative velocity and direction of blade rotation.
