= Mikhail Valerievich Lifshitz =

Russian engineer, pilot

Mikhail Lifshitz
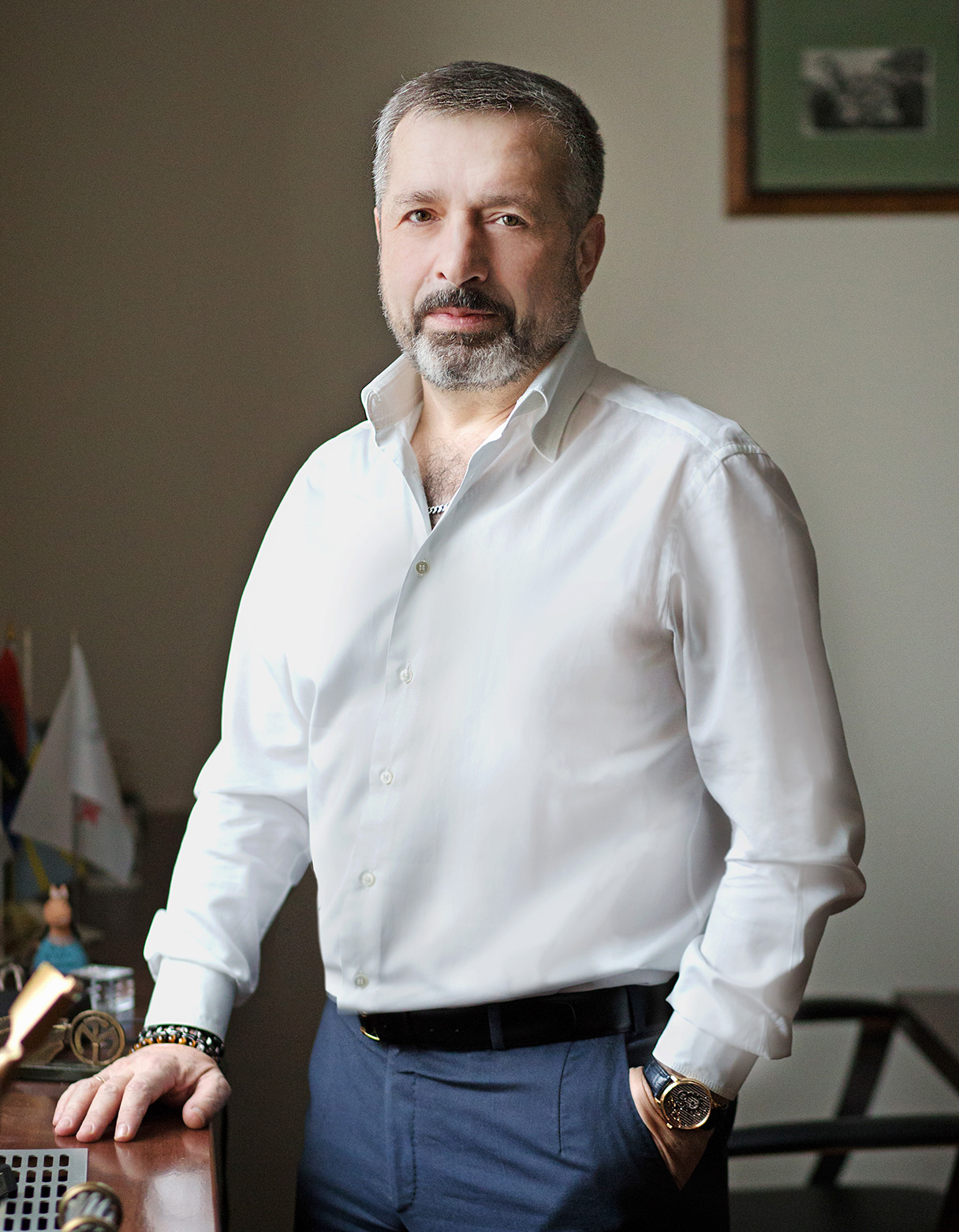
- Born: May 4, 1963 (age 63); Moscow, Russia
- Education: Bauman Moscow State Technical University
- Known for: President of Global Edge (1991–2009); CEO (2010–2015), Chairman of the Board of Directors (from 2015) of ROTEC; Chairman of the Board of Directors of The Ural Turbine Works (from 2012)
- Awards: Honored Mechanical Engineer of the Russian Federation; Order of the Polar Star (Mongolia)

Mikhail Valerievich Lifshitz (born May 4, 1963, Moscow) is a Russian engineer, entrepreneur and pilot. He is the Chairman of the Board of directors and shareholder of the Ural Turbine Works, ROTEC JSC, and TEEMP. Honored Mechanical Engineer of the Russian Federation.

== Early life and education ==
He was born on May 4, 1963 in Moscow.

He graduated from the Bauman Moscow State Technical University, and later from the Kaluga Aviation Flight and Technical School.

== Career ==
From 1991 to 1994, he was a marketing director at the Association of the Foreign Economic Cooperation of Small and Medium Businesses of the USSR.

In 1991, he founded the Global Edge group of companies and worked as President until 2009. Global Edge is a manufacturer of industrial cutting and sanding tools, engineering equipment and technology supplier for enterprises of the woodworking industry. By 2008, the company had created 45 thousand new jobs at almost 4500 woodworking enterprises all over the country.

In 2000, he established the KORUND LLC (former “Liner belt”) - abrasive tools producer (is a part of Global Edge now), based on the technology of the Saint-Gobain.

In 2009, he was a director of high-tech assets business development at the Renova group of companies.

Since 2010 till 2015, appointed as a CEO of ROTEC, from November 2015 elected as Chairman of the Board of directors. Mikhail Lifshitz managed designing and constructing an industrial center for the production of turbine blades from workpieces and recovery of large-capacity power gas turbine hot section parts (2016). In 2015 Lifshitz established the first in Russia repair and production facility of gas turbine hot section components, which was acquired by Sulzer in 2017. Under his leadership, ROTEC became the first independent player in the power gas turbine service market, taking up to 20%.

Mikhail Lifshitz founded (in 2011) and became the Chairman of the Board of Directors (till present) of the TEEMP Company (power storage solutions and supercapacitors manufacturer).

In 2015 Mikhail Lifshitz was heading development team that created the PRANA predictive diagnostics system, IIoT-solutions, able to reveal defects of industrial equipment before any effects on its performance ability (covering by service today). As of 2021, the system monitored more than 130 pieces of sophisticated industrial equipment with a total cost of about $5 billion.

In 2018 Lifshitz created the first production of superalloys honeycomb materials and components for airspace engines and industrial application. According to the Global Superalloy Honeycomb Panel Market Research Report 2020 Industry Research-2021 ROTEC production ranks third in the world.

From 2011 till present, he is co-owner and Chairman of the Board of directors of the Ural Turbine Works (UTW). Mikhail Lifshitz managed developing and implementing the enterprise modernization program. As a result, the plant reduced the design period for new turbine models to eight months, expanded the backlog of business orders on supplying new generating equipment and modernizing the turbines mounted on the territory of former USSR, mastered the production of condensing and marine steam turbines.

In 2021, by the decree of the President of Mongolia, Mikhail Lifshitz was awarded by the Order of the Polar Star for performing the modernization of the key Mongolian power plant, the Ulaanbaatar Combined Heat and Power Plant No. 4. Within two years, at the power plant, 4 power units were come into use, the Mongolian electric energy system power was updated by almost 60% (592 MW).

In 2016, Mikhail led a project of development and implementation of a new technology for the production of solar modules and the transition from thin-film technology to the HJT (heterojunction). By the transition to the new technology, the Havel plant was able to meet the demand for the Russian market of solar energetics by 50% and ranked among the top ten of global leaders in PV cells.

Mikhail Lifshitz has 32 Russian and international patents in the field of the mechanical engineering.

== Other activities ==
=== Corporate Boards ===
- Sulzer AG (pumps equipment, rotating equipment service, chemical technologies; Switzerland) – Board Member (from 2015).
- SOLIDpower S.p.a. (SOFC power generators; Italy) - Board Member.
- VoltAero (hybrid propulsion systems and small aircraft developer and manufacturer; France) - Advisory Board member.
- Hevel (PV cells and modules producer; Russia) - Board Member.
- Oerlikon AG Switzerland (2013-2015) - Board Member.

=== Non-profit organizations ===
- Swiss Russian Forum - Board Member.
- Russia-Mongolia Business Council - Co-chairman.
- Union of Mechanical Engineers of Russia – Committee Member.
- The Aero Club “Aircraft Commander – KVS” (FAI awarded in 2015) – Founder.

== Personal life ==
Mikhail Lifshitz is married, has two daughters and a son. He has a daggers collection. There are about 500 units in his collection, including unique specimens such as Scythian acinaces of the V century B.C.

=== Photography ===
In 2013, the Mikhail Lifshitz’s Sky&Soul: The World to Open photo exhibition was taken place. In spring of 2018, his personal GeoGrafika exhibition was taken place at the Lumiere Brothers Center for Photography.

=== Sport ===
In 1979, Mikhail Lifshitz completed his first solo flight in the airframe of BRO-11M. As for 2021, he piloted the Yak-18T sportplane, Cessna 172, Aero L-39 Albatros combat trainer, Let L-410 Turbolet two-engine passenger aircraft, and Robinson 44 helicopter. He owns the Yak-18T.

He is a master of sport in rally flying. From 1997 to 2003, he is a member of the Russian national air sport team.

He is one of founders of the KVS aero club.

In 1999, he took part in the 11th FAI World Rally Flying Championship. Lifshitz came 19th in the overall ranking together with his navigator Dmitry Sukharev.

In 2002, he was awarded by the FAI gold medal “The FAI Air Sport Medal”.

In 2003, he took part in the 13th FAI World Rally Flying Championship where he together with Dmitriy Sukharev come third in the second navigation competition and 16th in the overall ranking.

== Awards ==
- FAI gold medal “The FAI Air Sport Medal”. (Switzerland, 2002)
- Entrepreneur of the Year (Russia) according to Ernst & Young (2005 and 2009)
- Governor Award Medal of the Moscow region (Russia, 2007)
- Order of the Ukrainian Orthodox Church "Christmas of Christ" 2nd degree (Ukraine, 2010)
- Honorary Power Engineer (Mongolia, 2015)
- Honorary Mechanical Engineer (Russia, 2017).
- Order of the Polar Star (Mongolia, 2021)
