= Ural Turbine Works =

Energy equipment manufacturer in Yekaterinburg, Russia

The Ural Turbine Works
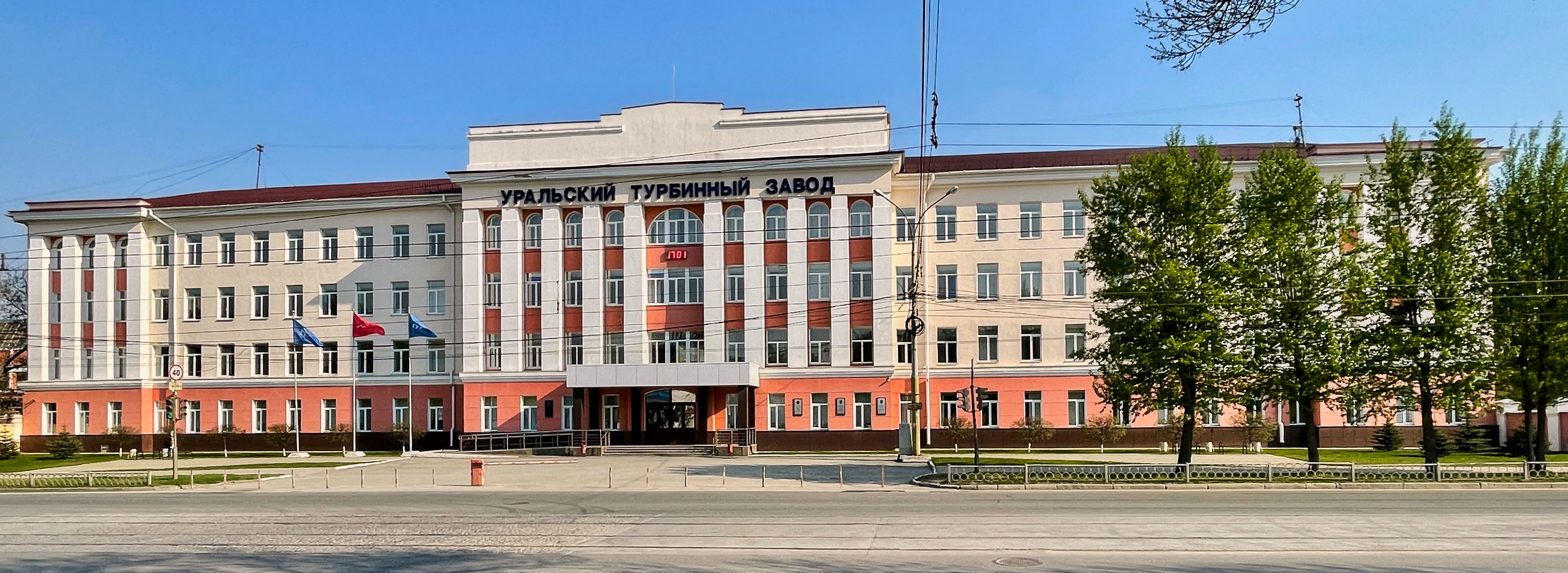
- Company type: Joint-stock company
- Industry: Power engineering
- Founded: 1938
- Headquarters: Yekaterinburg, Russia
- Key people: Mikhail Lifshitz – Chairman of the Board of Directors Dmitry Alexandrovich Izotin — General Director
- Products: steam turbines of varying capacity
- Number of employees: 1,800
- Website: www.utz.ru

The Ural Turbine Works is a power machine building plant that designs, manufactures, and maintains steam turbines of varying capacity. The plant is located in Yekaterinburg. Mikhail Lifshitz is Chairman of the Board of Directors.

== History ==
=== History of the name ===
- 1938–1948 – The Ural Turbine Works
- 1948–1948 – The Ural Turbine Motor Works
- 1976–2003 – The Turbine Motor Works
- 2004 – The Ural Turbine Works

=== USSR ===
In September 1936, the Council of Labor and Defense made a decision to build a turbine plant in Sverdlovsk that would supply the navy. The project was approved in 1937, and on October 2, 1938 the Ural Turbine Works (UTW) was founded.

The first unit of UTW’s design, a turbo feed pump for power plants, was released in 1940. The plant started their serial production.

In May 1941, UTW released a 12 MW turbine designed for combined heat and power generation (a cogeneration turbine). The manufacture of the first turbine was the pivotal point in the UTW’s history. The plant mastered the production of the most powerful steam heating turbine of the time. From that moment on, the plant focused on the production of heat extraction turbines.

During World War II, production facilities evacuated from Leningrad and Kharkov were stationed at the UTW site. The site hosted two plants: Tank Diesel Engine Plant No. 76 (now Ural Diesel Engine Plant) and the Ural Turbine Works.

During the war, UTW was referred to as a “turbine resort,” since it was the only operating turbine plant. The UTW workers has restored and refurbished 32 turbines, as the national power industry was in desperate need of turbine equipment. The factory participated in the restoration of Donbass stations, manufacturing a complete AT-25-2 turbine for the Lysychansk TPP (SevDonGRES). In 1942, the factory began producing ship turbines for naval vessels.

Originally, the turbine capacity was 16 MW, and since 1943 the plant began manufacturing TV-6 marine turbines with a capacity of 22 MW.

After the war, an engineering department was established at UTW, and the plant started independently designing turbines with a capacity of 25, 50, and 100 MW.

To meet the demands of the developing gas industry, the plant launched production of gas turbines in the late 1950s. An engineering school was opened at the plant. The first serial gas turbine – GT-6-750 – was produced in 1965.

In the 1960s, the plant was the first in the world to build a T-100 heat turbine with a capacity of 100,000 kW.

In 1966, the plant and its workers were awarded the Lenin Prize for the design, serial production, and introduction of the T-100 turbine to the state economy. The Ural Turbine Works has produced 245 turbines of various modifications of the T-100 family, commissioned over time at 106 Heat and Power Stations and State Regional Power Stations in 13 countries worldwide.

In the 1970s, UTW designed a series of gas utilization compressorless turbines for the iron and steel industry. For the first time in the USSR, gas turbines were awarded the state quality mark.

In 1973, the plant launched industrial production of 250 MW steam cogeneration turbines, the most powerful in the plant’s history. Between 1972 and 1992, the Ural Turbine Works has produced 32 of these units for power plants in Moscow, St. Petersburg, Minsk, Kiev, and Kharkov. Nineteen turbines of this kind have been installed in Moscow alone.

=== 21st century ===
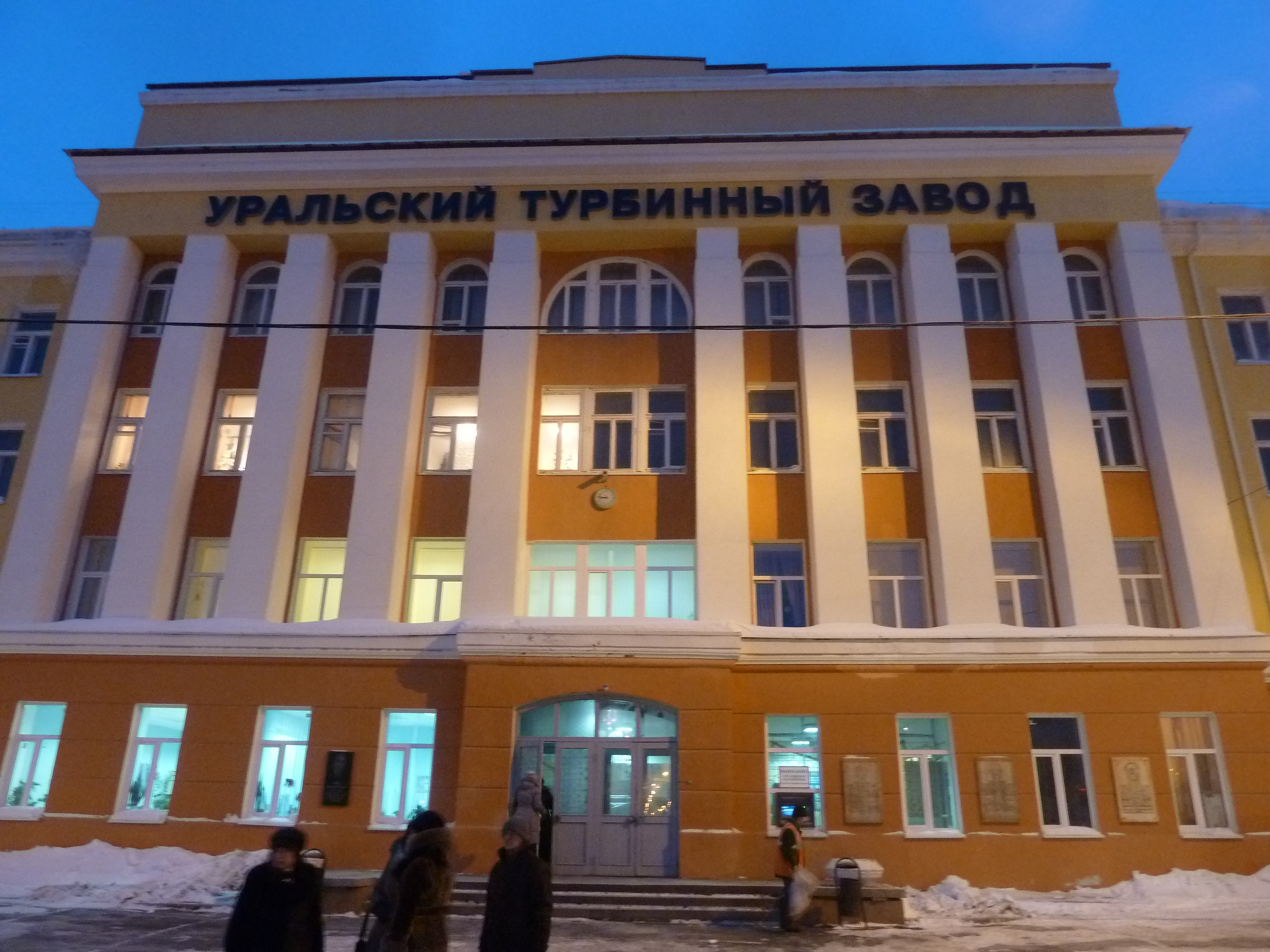
Plant administration building

In September 2003, the Turbine Motor Works OJSC was reorganized into an independent enterprise: the Ural Turbine Works JSC.

As of 2021, the plant manufactures condensing and cogeneration turbines for steam power plants, steam turbines for combined cycle power units, marine- type steam turbines, and power island equipment for waste incineration plants. The plant also provides power equipment maintenance and upgrading services.

In 2014, the plant has developed a range of marine turbines for RITM-200 and RITM-400 nuclear reactors on icebreakers.

Every year, UTW brings a new steam turbine design to the market (76 intellectual property patents have been issued to the plant between 2004 and 2024). The key projects include the T-295/335-23.5 power steam turbine, the world’s largest cogeneration turbine with a capacity of 335 MW and a heat load of 385 Mkcal/hr; Kp77-6.8 turbine for waste incineration plants with a capacity of 77 MW; power unit of the turbine plant and a set of heat transfer equipment for the new Russian icebreakers of Project 22220: Arctic, Siberia, and Ural.

Between 2018 and 2021, the plant has upgraded three T-100 turbines and the PT-80 unit at the Ulaanbaatar TPP-4 in Mongolia with a capacity of about 600 MW (the station accounts for 68.5% of Mongolia's power generation). In 2015, the project for upgrading the Ulaanbaatar Heat and Power Station #4 was awarded the Altan Gerege Award of the President of Mongolia and the Development Prize of Vnesheconombank in the Best Export Project category.

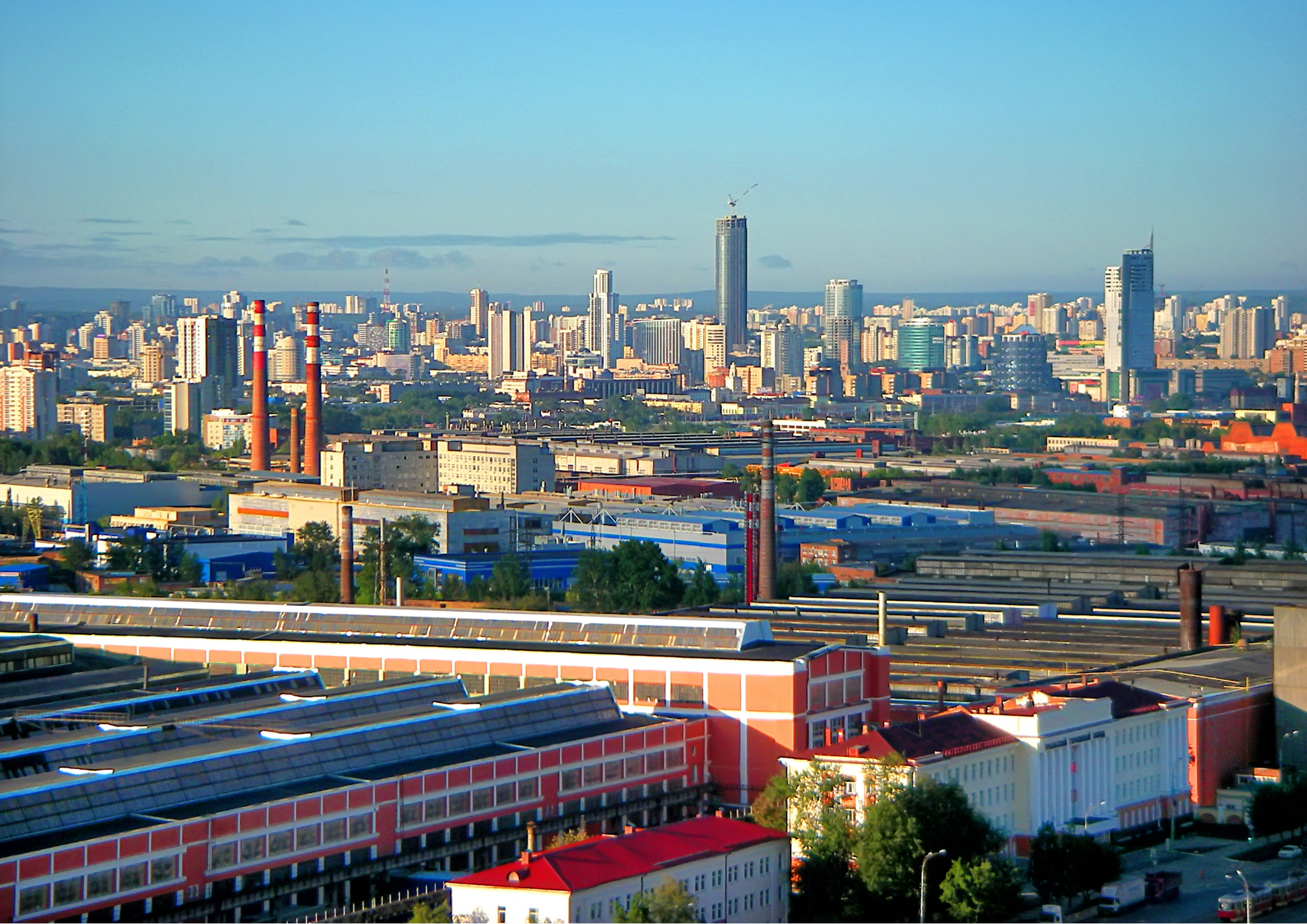
Plant buildings

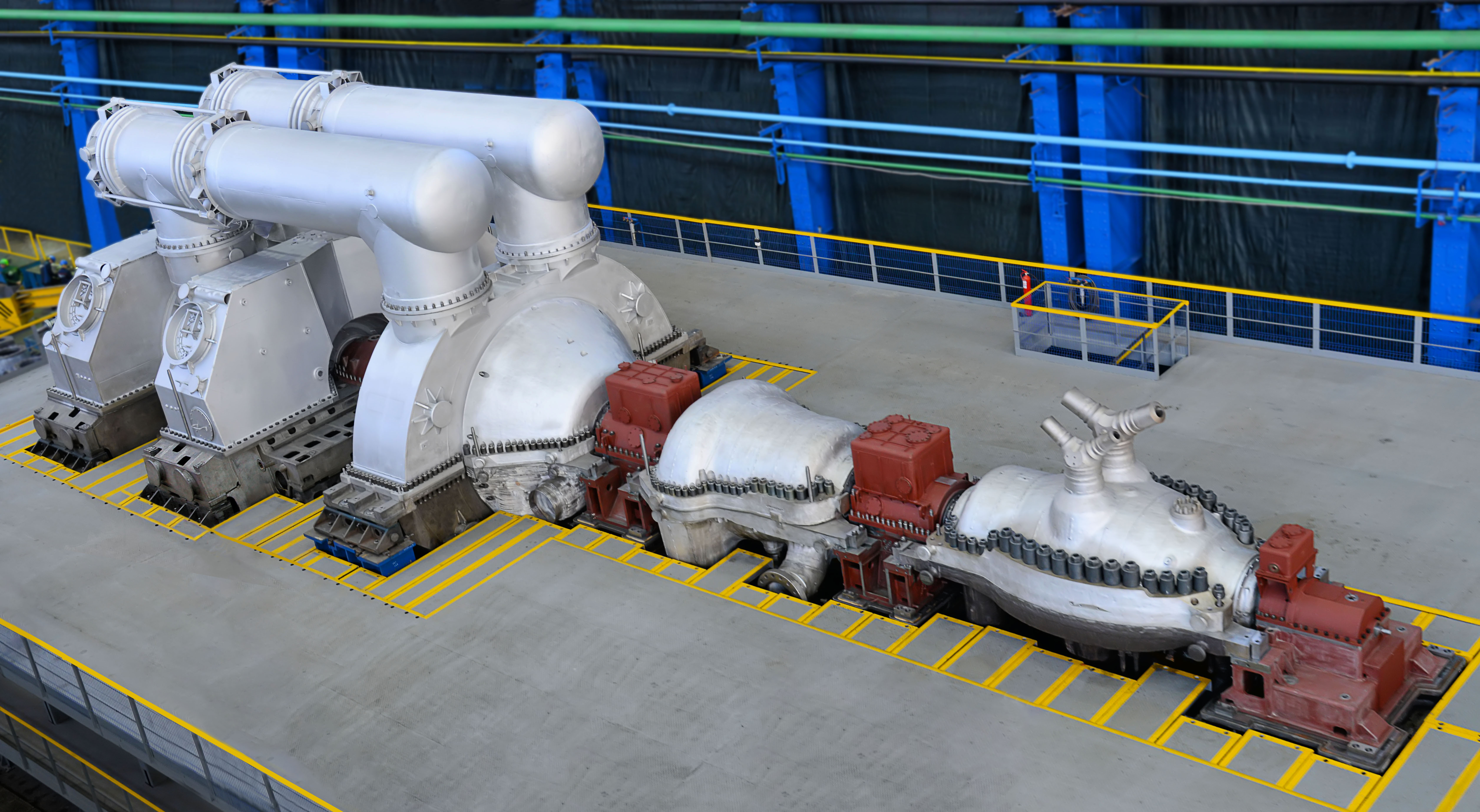
T-295 steam turbine on the assembly bench

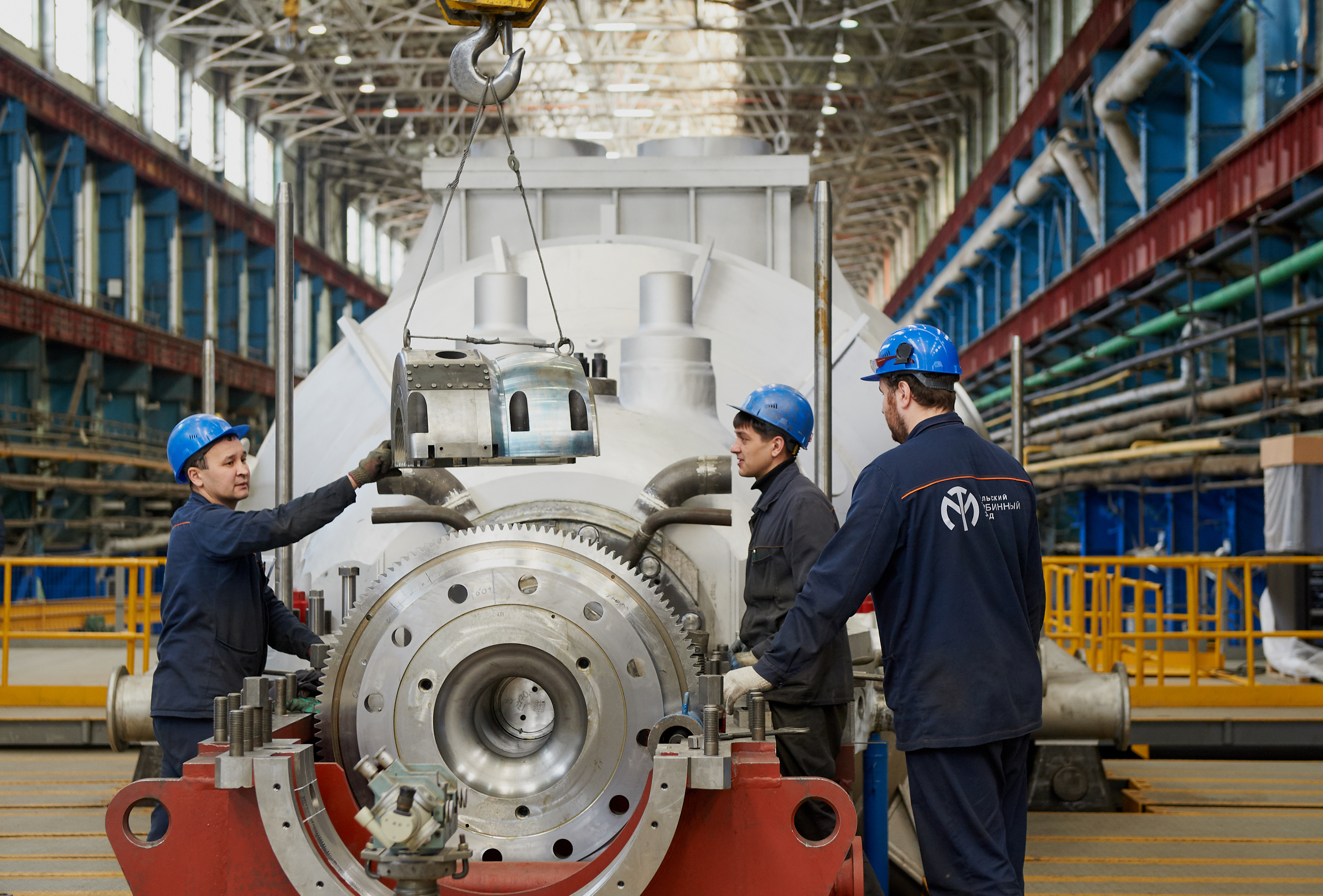
Assembly of a turbine at the plant

As of 2023, the plant manufactures condensing and cogeneration turbines for steam power plants, steam turbines for steam-gas power units, ship turbines for ships with nuclear power plants, power island equipment for waste-to-energy plants, and small power turbines for industrial generation. The plant also provides services for the maintenance and modernization of power equipment.

As of February 2024, the plant has produced 933 steam turbines. The equipment manufactured by the plant operates in 27 countries worldwide. More than half of all cogeneration turbines installed at power plants in Russia are produced by the plant.

In April 2023, the plant was sold to LLC "MosElectroshield".

== Products ==
- Steam turbines for steam power plants up to 350 MW
- Steam turbines for combined cycle power plants up to 200 MW
- Marine-type steam turbines
- Upgrading and maintenance of steam turbines up to 350 MW produced by the Ural Turbine Works or other manufacturers
- Steam turbines for waste-to-energy plants
- Line and regenerative heaters, condensers, ejectors, steel structures
- Maintenance and engineering support for operating steam turbines

== Awards ==
- USSR State Prize (1951, 1979)
- Lenin Prize (1966)
- Order of Lenin (1942)
- Order of the Red Banner of Labor (1943)
- Order of the Red Banner of Labor (1971)

== Bibliography ==
- Turbine Motor Works (a photobook) / ed. L. Krasnova – Sverdlovsk: Middle Urals Book Publishers, 1970.
- T.I. Efimova, M.A. Ardasheva. Turbine Motor Works: Deeds and People – Sverdlovsk: Middle Urals Book Publishers, 1988 °p. 400. ISBN 5-7529-0095-6
- V.A. Shkerin, A.P. Rastorguev. The Ural Turbine Works: Making Energy for 80 Years – Yekaterinburg, Uralsky Rabochy publishing and printing, 2018
- G.D. Barinberg, Yu.M. Brodov, A.A. Goldberg, L.S. Ioffe, V.V. Kortenko, A.Yu. Kultyshev, V.B. Novoselov, Yu.A. Sakhnin, M.Yu. Stepanov, M.V. Shekhter, T.L. Shibaev, A.A. Yamaltdinov. First Turbines and Turbine Plants of the Ural Turbine Works, 3rd edition – Yekaterinburg, Uralsky Rabochy publishing and printing, 2017
- A.A. Goldberg, L.S. Ioffe, A.Yu. Kultyshev, Yu.A. Sakhnin, M.Yu. Stepanov, M.V. Shekhter, T.L. Shibaev. Steam Turbines and Turbine Plants of the Ural Turbine Works for Combined Cycle Power Plants – Yekaterinburg, Training and Research Center Ural School of Technology, 2015.
