= Energy losses in steam turbines =

Because they are heat engines, steam turbines are subject to inefficiencies as they convert thermal energy in high-pressure steam to rotational kinetic energy in a shaft.

== Admission losses ==
In practice, the flow of steam through a nozzle is not isentropic, but accompanied by losses which decrease the kinetic energy of steam coming out of the nozzle. The decrease in kinetic energy is due to:

- viscous forces between steam particles
- heat loss from steam before entering the nozzle
- deflection of flow in the nozzle
- boundary layer development in the nozzle
- turbulence in the nozzle
- friction in the nozzle, which reduces the available enthalpy drop

Hence, the actual velocity leaving the nozzle is less than that obtained with isentropic expansion.

== Leakage losses ==
Steam leaves the boiler and reaches the condenser after passing through the main valve, regulating valves, nozzles, clearance spaces between nozzles and moving blades, diaphragm and rotating shaft, and other passages. Further, there is a large pressure difference between the inside of a steam turbine and the ambient atmosphere and also from one location to another location in these devices.

Therefore, steam leakage takes place through:

- the main valve and regulating valve
- seals and glands
- spaces between nozzles and moving blades
- spaces between the diaphragm and shaft of the turbine
- spaces between moving blade rings and the turbine casing

Leakage of steam through these gaps is a direct loss of energy.

== Friction losses ==
Frictional resistance is offered during the flow of steam through nozzles on moving and stationary blades. In most turbines, the blade wheels rotate in a space full of steam. The viscous friction at the wheel surface causes admission losses as steam passes from nozzle to wheel. The effect of partial admission creates eddies in the blade channels.

The surfaces of moving blades and stationary blades offers resistance, which increases with the roughness of the blade surfaces and the relative velocity between the steam and blades.

The energy loss also occurs when the steam jets turns along the curvature of the blade surface. The turning losses depend on the angle of turning.

== Exhaust loss ==
Any steam turbine, no matter how efficient, cannot extract all available energy from the steam. Despite being at very low pressure, the exhaust coming out of the turbine and entering the condenser carries some of kinetic energy and useful enthalpy, which is direct energy loss.

== Radiation and convection losses ==
The steam turbine operates at a relatively high temperature; therefore, some of the heat energy of steam is radiated and convected from the body of the turbine to its surroundings. These direct losses are minimized by proper insulation.

== Losses due to moisture ==
The steam passing through the last stage of turbine has a high velocity and a large moisture content. The liquid particles have lesser velocity than that of vapor particles; hence, the liquid particles obstruct the flow of vapor particles in the last stage of the turbine, and therefore, a part of kinetic energy of the steam is lost. If the dryness fraction of steam falls below 0.88, then erosion and corrosion of blades can also take place.

== Carry over losses ==
When steam passes from one stage to another through the diaphragm, some energy losses takes place, which are referred to as carry over losses. These losses reduce the kinetic energy of the steam available at succeeding stages of moving blades. This is due to formation of eddies in annular spaces between the nozzles and moving blades.
