= Tesla turbine =

Bladeless centripetal flow turbine

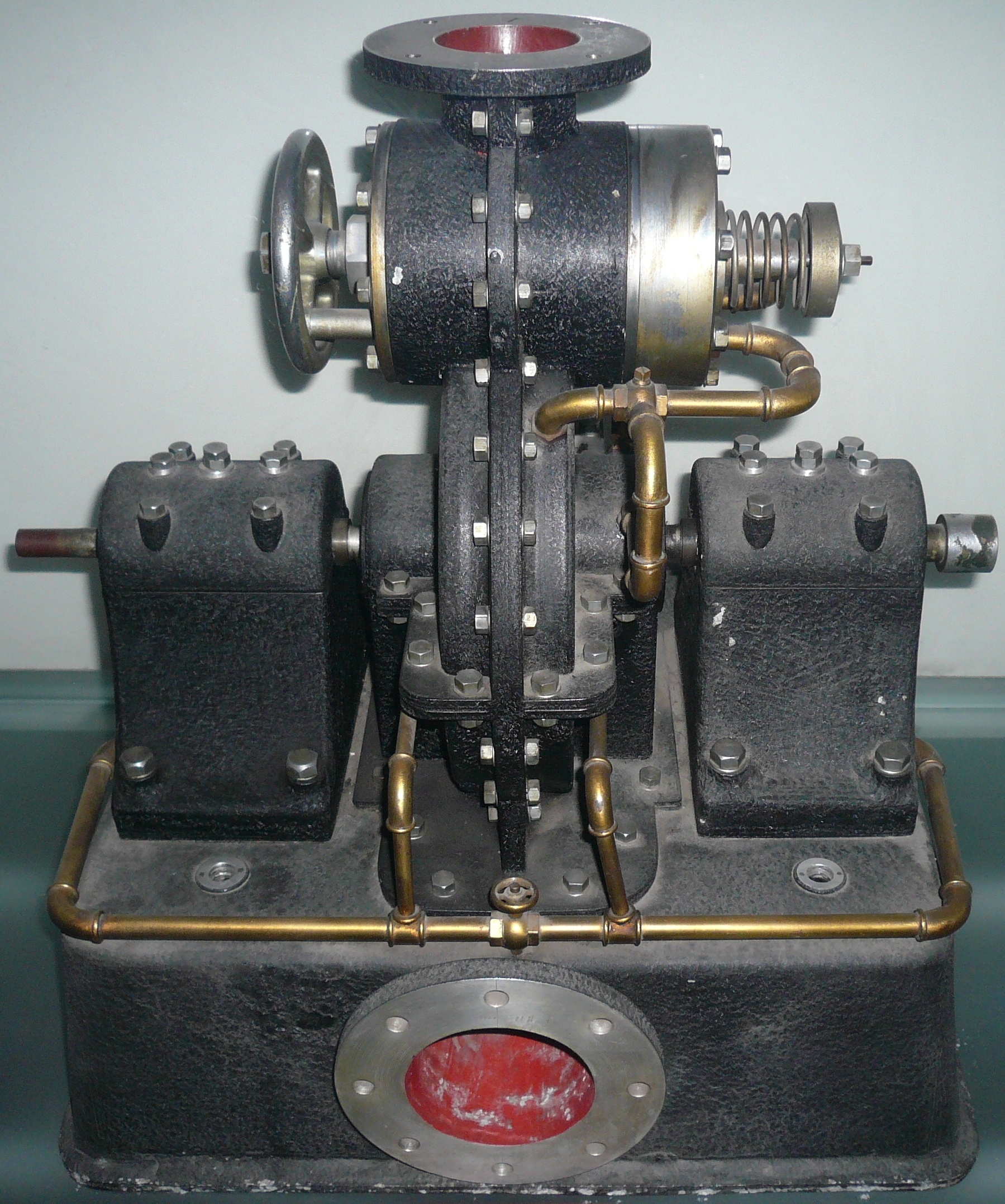
Tesla turbine at Nikola Tesla Museum

The Tesla turbine is a bladeless centripetal-flow turbine invented by Nikola Tesla in 1913. It functions as nozzles apply a moving fluid to the edges of a set of discs. The engine uses smooth discs rotating in a chamber to generate rotational movement due to the momentum exchange between the fluid and the discs. The discs are arranged in an orientation similar to a stack of CDs on an axle.

The Tesla turbine uses the boundary-layer effect, instead of the method employed by more conventional turbines, wherein a fluid acts on blades. The Tesla turbine is also referred to as the bladeless turbine, boundary-layer turbine, cohesion-type turbine, and Prandtl-layer turbine. The latter is named for Ludwig Prandtl. Bioengineering researchers have additionally referred to the Tesla turbine as a multiple-disk centrifugal pump.

One of Tesla's intended implementations for this turbine was for the generation of geothermal power, which he described in his work Our Future Motive Power.

== Theory ==
In the pump, the radial or static pressure, due to centrifugal force, is added to the tangential or dynamic, thus increasing the effective head and assisting in the expulsion of the fluid. In the motor, on the contrary, the first named pressure, being opposed to that of supply, reduces the effective head and the velocity of radial flow toward the center. Again, in the propelled machine, a great torque is always desirable, calling for an increased number of disks and a smaller distance of separation, while in the propelling machine, for numerous economic reasons, the rotary effort should be the smallest and the speed the greatest practicable.

— Nikola Tesla

In standard steam turbines, the steam must press on the blades for the rotor to extract energy from the steam; the blades must be carefully oriented to minimize the angle of attack to the blade surface area. In other words, in the optimal regime, the orientation of the blades minimizes the angle (blade pitch) with which the steam is hitting their surface area, to create smooth steam flow and to minimize turbulence. This turbulence reduces the amount of useful energy that can be extracted from the incoming steam flow.

In the Tesla turbine, considering that there are no blades to be impacted, the mechanics of the reaction forces are different. The reaction force to the steam head pressure builds relatively quickly, in the form of a steam pressure "belt" along the periphery of the turbine. That belt is most dense and pressurized in the periphery as its pressure, when the rotor is not under load, will not be much less than the (incoming) steam pressure. In a normal operational mode, that peripheral pressure limits the flow of the incoming stream, and in this way, the Tesla turbine can be said to be self-governing. When the rotor is not under load, the relative speeds between the "steam compressed spirals" (SCS, the steam spirally rotating between the disks) and the disks are minimal.

When a load is applied to the Tesla turbine, the shaft slows down; that is, the speed of the discs relative to the (moving) fluid increases as the fluid, at least initially, preserves its angular momentum. For example, in a 10 cm (3.9 in) radius, where at 9000 RPM the peripheral disk speeds are 90 m/s (300 ft/s) when there is no load on the rotor, the disks move at approximately the same speed as the fluid, but when the rotor is loaded, the relative velocity differential (between the SCS and the metal disks) increases and, at a rotor speed of 45 m/s (150 ft/s), the rotor has a relative speed of 45 m/s to the SCS. This is a dynamic environment, and these speeds reach these values over a time interval and not instantly. Here, we have to note that fluids start to behave like solid bodies at high relative velocities, and in the case of the Tesla turbine, we also have to take into consideration the additional pressure. With this pressure and relative velocity toward the faces of the discs, the steam should start behaving like a solid body (SCS) dragging on the disks' surfaces. The created "friction" can only lead to the generation of additional heat directly on the disk and in SCS and will be most pronounced in the peripheral layer, where the relative velocity between the metal discs and SCS discs is the highest. This increase in the temperature, due to the friction between the SCS disks and the turbine disks, will be translated to an increase in the SCS temperature, and that will lead to SCS steam expansion and pressure increase perpendicular to the metal discs as well as radially on the axis of rotation, and so this fluid-dynamic model appears to be positive feedback for transmitting a stronger "dragging" on the metal disks and consequently increasing the torque at the axis of rotation.

== Design ==
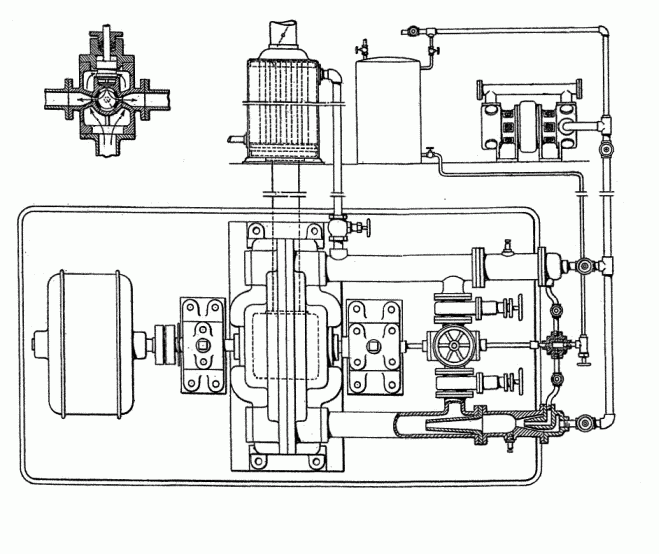
View of Tesla turbine system

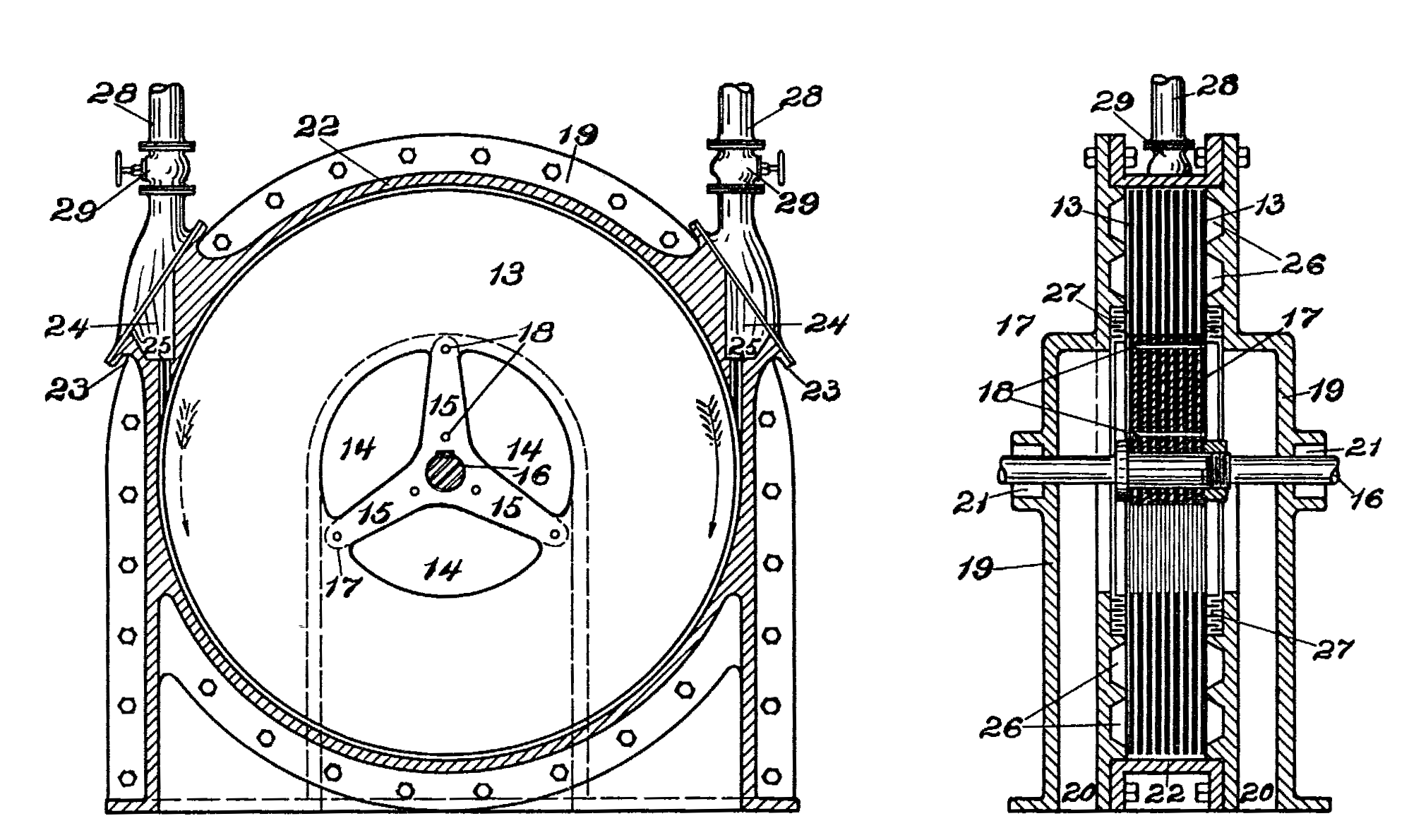
View of Tesla turbine bladeless design

The guiding principle for developing the Tesla turbine is the idea that, to obtain the highest efficiency, the changes in the velocity and direction of movement of fluid should be as gradual as possible. Therefore, the propelling fluid of the Tesla turbine moves in natural paths, or streamlines, of least resistance.

A Tesla turbine consists of a set of smooth disks, with nozzles applying a moving fluid to the edge of the disk. The fluid drags on the disk through viscosity and the adhesion of the surface layer of the fluid. As the fluid slows and adds energy to the disks, it spirals into the center exhaust. Since the rotor is a simple disk, it is more robust and easier to manufacture, compared to a traditional bladed turbine.

Tesla wrote:

This turbine is an efficient self-starting prime mover which may be operated as a steam or mixed fluid turbine at will, without changes in construction and is on this account, very convenient. Minor departures from the turbine, as may be dictated by the circumstances in each case, will suggest themselves but if it is carried out on these general lines, it will be found highly profitable to the owners of the steam plant while permitting the use of their old installation. However, the best economic results in the development of power from steam by the Tesla turbine will be obtained in plants especially adapted for the purpose.

Smooth rotor disks were originally proposed, but these gave poor starting torque. Tesla subsequently discovered that smooth rotor disks with small washers bridging the disks in about 12 to 24 places around the perimeter of a 10″ disk and a second ring of 6–12 washers at a sub-diameter made for a significant improvement in starting torque without compromising efficiency.

== Efficiency and calculations ==
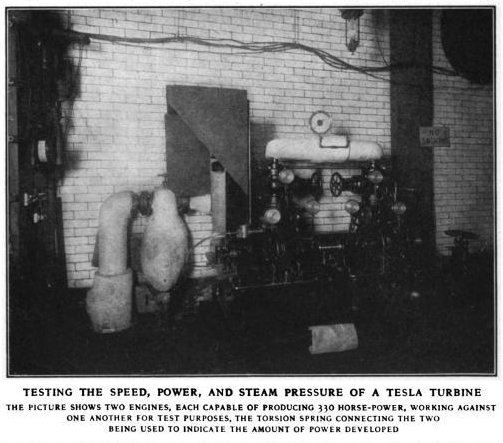
Testing of a Tesla turbine

In Tesla's time, the efficiency of conventional turbines was low because turbines used a direct-drive system that severely limited the potential usable output speed of a turbine. At the time of introduction, ship turbines were massive, and included dozens, or even hundreds, of stages of turbines, yet produced extremely low efficiency due to their low speed. For example, the turbine on both the Olympic and Titanic weighed over 400 tons, ran at only 165 rpm, and used steam at a pressure of only 6 psi. This limited it to harvesting waste steam from the main power plants, a pair of reciprocating steam engines. The Tesla turbine could run on higher-temperature gases than bladed turbines of the time, which contributed to its greater efficiency. Eventually, axial turbines were given gearing to allow them to operate at higher speeds, but the efficiency of axial turbines remained very low in comparison to the Tesla turbine.

Continued improvements resulted in dramatically more efficient and powerful axial turbines, and a second stage of reduction gears was introduced in most cutting-edge U.S. naval ships of the 1930s. The improvement in steam technology gave the U.S. Navy aircraft carriers a clear advantage in speed over both Allied and enemy aircraft carriers, and so the proven axial steam turbines became the preferred form of propulsion until the 1973 oil crisis, which drove the majority of new civilian vessels to turn to diesel engines. Axial steam turbines still had not exceeded 50% efficiency by that time, and so civilian ships chose to use diesel engines due to their superior efficiency. By this time, the comparably-efficient Tesla turbine was over 60 years old.

Tesla's design attempted to sidestep the key drawbacks of the bladed axial turbines, and even the lowest estimates for efficiency still dramatically outperformed the efficiency of axial steam turbines of the day. However, in testing against more modern engines, the Tesla turbine had expansion efficiencies far below contemporary steam turbines and far below contemporary reciprocating steam engines. It also suffers from other problems, such as shear losses and flow restrictions, but this is partially offset by the relatively massive reduction in weight and volume. Some of the Tesla turbine's advantages lie in relatively-low-flow-rate applications or when small sizes are needed. The disks need to be as thin as possible at the edges in order to not introduce turbulence as the fluid leaves the disks. This translates to needing to increase the number of disks as the flow rate increases. Maximum efficiency comes in this system when the inter-disk spacing approximates the thickness of the boundary layer, and since boundary layer thickness is dependent on viscosity and pressure, the claim that a single design can be used efficiently for a variety of fuels and fluids is incorrect. A Tesla turbine differs from a conventional turbine only in the mechanism used for transferring energy to the shaft. Various analyses demonstrate that the flow rate between the disks must be kept relatively low to maintain efficiency. Reportedly, the efficiency of the Tesla turbine decreases with increased load. Under light load, the spiral taken by the fluid moving from the intake to the exhaust is tight, undergoing many rotations. Under load, the number of rotations drops, and the spiral becomes progressively shorter. This will increase the shear losses and also reduce the efficiency because the gas is in contact with the discs for less distance.

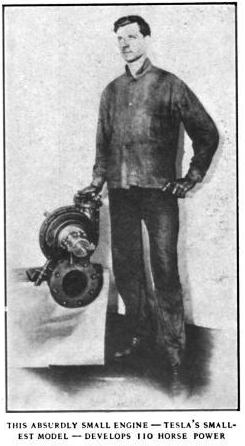
A man holding a Tesla turbine

The turbine efficiency (defined as the ratio of the ideal change in enthalpy to the real enthalpy for the same change in pressure) of the gas Tesla turbine is estimated to be above 60%. The turbine efficiency is different from the cycle efficiency of the engine using the turbine. Axial turbines that operate today in steam plants or jet engines have efficiencies of over 90%. This is different from the cycle efficiencies of the plant or engine, which are between approximately 25% and 42%, and are limited by any irreversibility to be below the Carnot cycle efficiency. Tesla claimed that a steam version of his device would achieve around 95% efficiency. The thermodynamic efficiency is a measure of how well it performs compared to an isentropic case. It is the ratio of the ideal to the actual work input/output.

In the 1950s, Warren Rice attempted to recreate Tesla's experiments, but he did not perform these early tests on a pump built strictly in line with Tesla's patented design (it, among other things, was not a Tesla multiple staged turbine nor did it possess Tesla's nozzle). Rice's experimental single-stage system's working fluid was air. Rice's test turbines, as published in early reports, produced an overall measured efficiency of 36–41% for a single stage. Higher efficiency would be expected if designed as originally proposed by Tesla.

In his final work with the Tesla turbine published just before his retirement, Rice conducted a bulk-parameter analysis of model laminar flow in multiple disk turbines. A very high claim for rotor efficiency (as opposed to overall device efficiency) for this design was published in 1991 titled "Tesla Turbomachinery". This paper states:

With proper use of the analytical results, the rotor efficiency using laminar flow can be very high, even above 95%. However, to attain high rotor efficiency, the flowrate number must be made small, which means high rotor efficiency is achieved at the expense of using a large number of disks and hence a physically larger rotor. For each value of the flow rate number, there is an optimum value of the Reynolds number for maximum efficiency. With common fluids, the required disk spacing is dismally small causing [rotors using] laminar flow to tend to be large and heavy for a prescribed throughflow rate.

Extensive investigations have been made of Tesla-type liquid pumps using laminar-flow rotors. It was found that overall pump efficiency was low even when rotor efficiency was high because of the losses occurring at the rotor entrance and exit earlier mentioned.

—

Modern multiple-stage bladed turbines typically reach 60–70% efficiency, while large steam turbines often show turbine efficiency of over 90% in practice. Volute rotor-matched Tesla-type machines of reasonable size with common fluids (steam, gas, and water) would also be expected to show efficiencies in the vicinity of 60–70% and possibly higher.

== Applications ==
A Tesla turbine with the top removed

Tesla's patents state that the device was intended for the use of fluids as motive agents, as distinguished from the propulsion or compression of fluids (though it can also be used for those purposes). As of 2016, the Tesla turbine has not seen widespread commercial use. The Tesla pump, however, has been commercially available since 1982 and is used to pump fluids that are abrasive, viscous, shear-sensitive, loaded with solids, or are otherwise difficult to handle with other pumps. Tesla himself did not procure a large contract for production. The main disadvantage was poor knowledge of material characteristics and behaviors at high temperatures. The best metallurgy of the day could not prevent the turbine disks from moving and warping unacceptably during operation.

Many amateur experiments have been conducted using Tesla turbines with compressed air or steam as the power source. Disc warping has been ameliorated by using new materials such as carbon fiber.

One proposed application for the device is a waste pump, in factories and mills where normal vane-type turbine pumps typically become fouled.

Applications of the Tesla turbine as a multiple-disk centrifugal blood pump have yielded promising results due to the low peak shear force. Biomedical engineering research on such applications has continued into the 21st century.

The device functions as a pump if a similar set of disks and a housing with an involute shape (versus circular for the turbine) are used. In this configuration, a motor is attached to the shaft. The fluid enters near the center, is energized by the disks, and exits at the periphery. The Tesla turbine does not use friction in the conventional sense, rather using adhesion (the Coandă effect) and viscosity instead. It uses the boundary-layer effect on the disc blades.

== History ==
The turbine was patented by Nikola Tesla on October 21, 1913, which was his 100th patent.

== See also ==
- List of Nikola Tesla patents
- Radial turbine
- Tesla coil
