= List of Nikola Tesla writings =

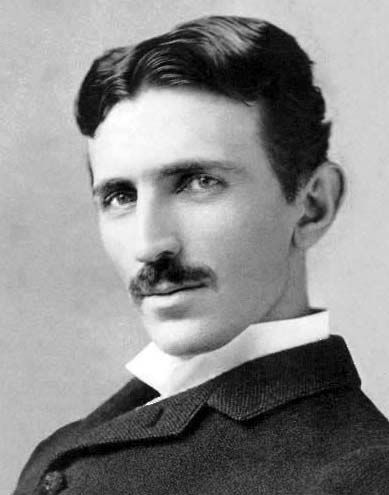
Tesla, aged 37, 1893, photo by Napoleon Sarony

Tesla wrote a number of books and articles for magazines and journals. Among his books are My Inventions: The Autobiography of Nikola Tesla; The Fantastic Inventions of Nikola Tesla, compiled and edited by David Hatcher Childress; and The Tesla Papers.

Many of Tesla's writings are freely available on the web, including the article, The Problem of Increasing Human Energy, which he wrote for The Century Magazine in 1900, and the article, Experiments With Alternate Currents Of High Potential And High Frequency, published in his book, Inventions, Researches and Writings of Nikola Tesla.

== Works ==
1. A New System of Alternate Current Motors and Transformers, AIEE Address, May 16, 1888
2. Phenomena of Alternating Currents of Very High Frequency, Electrical World, Feb. 21, 1891
3. Experiments with Alternate Currents of Very High Frequency and Their Application to Methods of Artificial Illumination, AIEE, Columbia College, N.Y., May 20, 1891
4. Experiments with Alternate Currents of High Potential and High Frequency, IEE Address, London, February 1892
5. On Light and Other High Frequency Phenomena, Franklin Institute, Philadelphia, February 1893, and National Electric Light Association, St. Louis, March 1893
6. On the Dissipation of the Electrical Energy of the Hertz Resonator, Electrical Engineer, Dec. 21, 1892
7. On Electricity, Electrical Review, January 27, 1897
8. High Frequency Oscillators for Electro-therapeutic and Other Purposes, Electrical Engineer, November 17, 1898
9. Plans to Dispense With Artillery of the Present Type, The Sun, New York, November 21, 1898
10. Tesla Describes His Efforts in Various Fields of Work, Electrical Review - New York, November 30, 1898
11. On Current Interrupters, Electrical Review, March 15, 1899
12. The Problem of Increasing Human Energy, Century Illustrated Monthly Magazine, June 1900
13. Tesla's New Discovery, The Sun, New York, January 30, 1901
14. Talking With Planets, Collier's Weekly, February 9, 1901
15. The Transmission of Electrical Energy Without Wires, Electrical World, March 5, 1904
16. Electric Autos, Manufacturers' Record, December 29, 1904
17. The Transmission of Electrical Energy Without Wires as a Means for Furthering Peace, Electrical World and Engineer, January 7, 1905
18. Tuned Lightning, English Mechanic and World of Science, March 8, 1907
19. Tesla's Wireless Torpedo, New York Times, March 19, 1907
20. Possibilities of Wireless, New York Times, Oct. 22, 1907
21. The Future of the Wireless Art, Wireless Telegraphy & Telephony, Van Nostrand, 1908
22. Mr. Tesla's Vision, New York Times, April 21, 1908
23. Nikola Tesla's New Wireless, The Electrical Engineer - London, December 24, 1909
24. Dr. Tesla Talks of Gas Turbines, Motor World, September 18, 1911
25. Tesla's New Monarch of Machines, New York Herald, Oct. 15, 1911
26. The Disturbing Influence of Solar Radiation On the Wireless Transmission of Energy, Electrical Review and Western Electrician, July 6, 1912
27. How Cosmic Forces Shape Our Destinies, New York American, February 7, 1915
28. Some Personal Recollections, Scientific American, June 5, 1915
29. The Wonder World To Be Created By Electricity, Manufacturer's Record, September 9, 1915
30. Nikola Tesla Sees a Wireless Vision, New York Times, Sunday, October 3, 1915
31. Tesla's New Device Like Bolts of Thor, New York Times, December 8, 1915
32. Wonders of the Future, Collier's Weekly, December 2, 1916
33. Electric Drive for Battle Ships, New York Herald, February 25, 1917
34. My Inventions, Electrical Experimenter, February–June and October 1919
35. Famous Scientific Illusions, Electrical Experimenter, February 1919
36. The True Wireless, Electrical Experimenter, May 1919
37. Electrical Oscillators, Electrical Experimenter, July 1919
38. World System of Wireless Transmission of Energy, Telegraph and Telegraph Age, October 16, 1927
39. Our Future Motive Power, Everyday Science and Mechanics, December 1931
40. Pioneer Radio Engineer Gives Views On Power, New York Herald Tribune, September 11, 1932
41. The Eternal Source of Energy of the Universe, Origin and Intensity of Cosmic Rays, New York, October 13, 1932
42. Tesla on Power Development and Future Marvels, New York World Telegram, July 24, 1934
43. The New Art of Projecting Concentrated Non-dispersive Energy Through Natural Media, 1935
44. A Machine to End War, Liberty, February 1935
45. Tesla Predicts Ships Powered by Shore Beam, New York Herald Tribune, May 5, 1935
46. Mechanical Therapy

== Works About Tesla ==
1. The Tesla Effects With High Frequency and High Potential Currents, Introduction.--The Scope of the Tesla Lectures.
2. Tesla's Oscillator and Other Inventions, Century Illustrated Monthly Magazine, April 1895
3. Earth Electricity to Kill Monopoly, The World Sunday Magazine — March 8, 1896
4. Inventor Tesla's Plant Nearing Completion, Brooklyn Eagle, February 8, 1902
5. Nikola Tesla's New Wireless, The Electrical Engineer - London, December 24, 1909
6. Presentation of the Edison Medal to Nikola Tesla, May 8, 1917
7. Tesla's Views on Electricity and the War, The Electrical Experimenter, August 1917
8. Rain Can Be Controlled and Hydraulic Force Provided . . . , Syracuse Herald, ca. February 29, 1920
9. When Woman is Boss, Colliers, January 30, 1926
10. Nikola Tesla Tells of New Radio Theories, New York Herald Tribune, September 22, 1929
11. Tesla Cosmic Ray Motor May Transmit Power ‘Round Earth, Brooklyn Eagle, July 10, 1932
12. Tesla Invents Peace Ray, New York Sun, July 10, 1934
13. Dr. Tesla Visions the End of Aircraft In War, Every Week Magazine, October 21, 1934
14. Tesla Tries to Prevent World War II, Prodigal Genius, 1944 — Unpublished Chapter 34
15. A Story of Youth Told by Age, Written to Miss Fotitch Kristasia

== Poems ==
From his childhood on Tesla wrote poetry but considered it too personal to be published. In the late 1920s, Tesla composed a poem—"Fragments of Olympian Gossip"—for his friend, George Sylvester Viereck, an illustrious German poet and mystic. It poked vitriolic fun at the scientific establishment of the day. For example, he derided Albert Einstein for claiming that matter and force are transmutable (Mass–energy equivalence), noting that Archimedes and Isaac Newton had stated that they are not.
