= The Fatherland =

The Fatherland was a World War I era weekly periodical published by poet, writer, and propagandist George Sylvester Viereck (1884–1962), advocating "Fair Play for Germany and Austria-Hungary". Having been born in Munich, Germany, and moved to New York City in 1896, Viereck graduated from the College of the City of New York and directly entered the world of publishing.

== Background ==
Viereck outspokenly supported the German cause at the outset of World War I, and his poetry reflected his pro-German zeal. Drawing on experience gained while working on his father's German-language monthly, Der deutsche Vorkämpfer (The German Pioneer), later called Rundschau Zweier Welten (Review of Two Worlds), the younger Viereck now channeled his German sympathies into his own publication. He founded The Fatherland in August 1914, a weekly publication in English that reached a circulation of 75,000, by some estimates, and 100,000 by others, to promote American neutrality in the war and give voice to German support. The Fatherland was advertised on the cover of its first issues as a magazine devoted to “Fair Play for Germany and Austria-Hungary.”

Three German-American banker friends helped Viereck with the fifty dollars needed to start up The Fatherland. The first edition of ten thousand copies sold out quickly in New York. The publication grew to thirty employees almost immediately and “took upon itself the task of exposing the malfeasance of the Allied countries, of revealing the prejudices and distortions of the American press, and of rallying German-Americans in their own defense.” The weekly received part of its funding from a German propaganda cabinet set up in New York society, with which Viereck worked closely.

One of the contributors to The Fatherland was Aleister Crowley.

Viereck was accused by the New York World of receiving German subsidies for propaganda purposes, but the Department of Justice was unable to prosecute. Still, Viereck faced social censure, being driven from his house by a lynch mob and expelled from the Authors League as well as the Poetry Society of America.

Viereck’s personal circumstances affected the publication life and reception of The Fatherland. When America entered the war, he subdued the publication’s tone of German sympathy and changed its title. It was New World and Viereck's: The American Weekly in February 1917, Viereck's American Monthly in August 1918, and American Monthly in October 1920.

The Joseph McGarrity Collection of Villanova University’s Special Collections and Digital Library contains issues of The Fatherland from volume 1:1 (August 1914) to 6:2 (February 1917).

== Editions ==
- 1914
  - The Fatherland v. 1 no. 1 - v. 1 no. 21
- 1915
  - The Fatherland v. 1 no. 22 - v. 3 no. 21
- 1916
  - The Fatherland v. 3 no. 22 - v. 5 no. 21
- 1917
  - The Fatherland v. 5 no. 22 - v. 6 no. 2
