= List of Nikola Tesla patents =

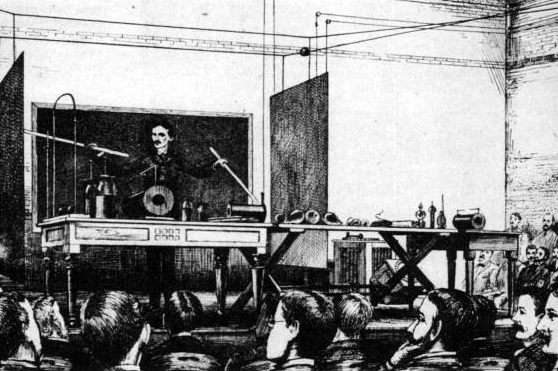
Wireless transmission of power and energy demonstration during his 1891 lecture, on very high frequency and potential

Nikola Tesla was an inventor who obtained around 300 patents worldwide for his inventions. Some of Tesla's patents are not accounted for, and various sources have discovered some that have lain hidden in patent archives. There are a minimum of 278 patents issued to Tesla in 26 countries that have been accounted for. Many of Tesla's patents were in the United States, Britain, and Canada, but many other patents were approved in countries around the globe. Many inventions developed by Tesla were not put into patent protection.

== American ==
=== Patents #1–#50 ===
1. U.S. patent 334,823 - Commutator for Dynamo Electric Machines - 1886 January 26 - Elements to prevent sparking on dynamo-electric machines; Drum-style with brushes.
2. U.S. patent 335,786 - Electric Arc lamp - 1886 February 9 - Arc lamp with carbon electrodes controlled by electromagnets or solenoids and a clutch mechanism; Corrects earlier design flaws common to the industry.
3. U.S. patent 335,787 - Electric arc lamp - 1886 February 9 - Arc lamp's automatic fail switch when arc possesses abnormal behavior; Automatic reactivation.
4. U.S. patent 336,961 - Regulator for dynamo electric machines - 1886 March 2 - Two main brushes connected to helices coil ends; Intermediate point branch shunt connection for third brush.
5. U.S. patent 336,962 - Regulator for Dynamo Electric Machines - 1886 March 2 - Auxiliary brush[es] shunting a portion or whole of the field helices coil; Regulates energy flow; Adjustable level of current.
6. U.S. patent 350,954 - Regulator for Dynamo Electric Machines - 1886 October 19 - Automatic regulation of energy levels; Mechanical device to shift brushes.
7. U.S. patent 359,748 - Dynamo electric machine - 1887 March 22 - Improve construction; Facilitate easier construction; Reduce the cost; Magnetic frame; Armature; Alternating current synchronous motor.
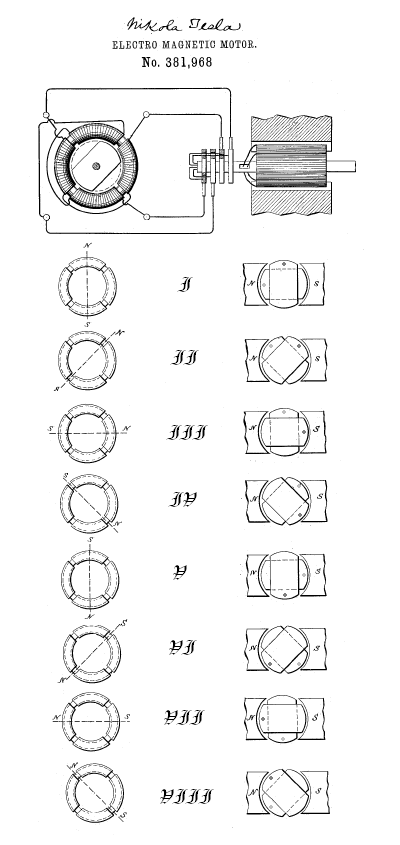
  381968 - Electro magnetic motor
8. U.S. patent 381,968 - Electro magnetic motor - 1888 May 1 - Mode and plan of operating electric motors by progressive shifting; Field Magnet; Armature; Electrical conversion; Economical; Transmission of energy; Simple construction; Easier construction; Rotating magnetic field principles.
9. U.S. patent 381,969 - Electro Magnetic Motor - 1888 May 1 - Novel form and operating mode; Coils forming independent energizing circuits; Connected to an alternating current generator; Synchronous motor.
10. U.S. patent 381,970 - System of Electrical Distribution - 1888 May 1 - Current from a single source of supply in the main or transmitting circuit induce by induction apparatus; Independent circuit(s); Electric distributor.
11. U.S. patent 382,279 - Electro Magnetic Motor - 1888 May 1 - Rotation is produced and maintained by direct attraction; Utilizes shifting poles; Induction magnetic motor.
12. U.S. patent 382,280 - Electrical Transmission of Power - 1888 May 1 - New method or mode of transmission; Dynamo motor conversion with two independent circuits for long distance transmission; Alternating current transmission; Includes a disclaimer; Economic; Efficient.
13. U.S. patent 382,281 - Electrical Transmission of Power - 1888 May 1 - Improvements in electromagnetic motors and their mode or methods of their operations; Motor is wound with coils forming independent circuits on the armature; Armature is mounted to rotate between two different poles; Armature will eventually synchronize with that of the generator; Windcoils or coils on the field magnets; Expose to continuous current to maintain a permanent field.
14. U.S. patent 382,282 - Method of Converting and Distributing Electric Currents - 1888 May 1 - Related to electric distribution systems; Current is from a single main source or suitable transmitting circuit; Induction into an independent circuit; Divide the current from a single source; Transformations; Discovery of method to avoid prior liable and dangerous methods; True Dynamic induction.
15. U.S. patent 382,845 - Commutator for dynamo electric machines - 1888 May 15 - Relates to dynamo-electric machines or motors; Improvements on devices to collect or communicate currents; Avoids destruction and wear of machine; Avoid adjustments due to destruction and wear; Enable practical construction of very large dynamo electric machines or motors with the minimum number of communicator segments; Increases safety and efficiency.
16. U.S. patent 390,413 - System of electrical distribution - 1888 October 2 - Related to previous electric distribution systems developed by Tesla; Examples of systems in operation with motors or converters, or both, in parallel; Examples of systems in parallel; Examples of systems in series.
17. U.S. patent 390,414 - Dynamo Electric Machine - 1888 October 2 - Related to the patents of Tesla and Charles F. Peck, numbers: US381968 and US382280; Ordinary forms of continuous and alternate current systems may be adapted to Tesla's system, with slight changes to the systems; Effects their forms; Only the best and most practical solutions are presented to the three most common forms of the devices applicable; Illustrated are the continuous (or closed) circuit machines, machines possessing armatures with coils connected diametrically (known as "open-circuits"), and machines with armature-coils of which have a common joint.
18. U.S. patent 390,415 - Dynamo Electric Machine or Motor - 1888 October 2 - Improvement in the construction of dynamo or magneto electric machines; Novel form of frame and field magnets that renders the machine more sturdy and compact as a structure; Requires fewer parts; Less difficulty in construction; Lower expense; Useful to alternating and continuous current machines.
19. U.S. patent 390,721 - Dynamo Electric Machine - 1888 October 9 - Relates chiefly to the alternate current machine invented by Tesla; Related to patents numbered US381968 and US382280; Seeks to avoid mechanical drawback of running high frequency machines; Efficient at low speeds; Producing rotating magnetic poles in one element of the machine and drive the other at a different speed.
20. U.S. patent 390,820 - Regulator for Alternate Current Motors - 1888 October 9 - Improvement in the electrical transmission systems; Means of regulating and power of the motor or motors; Used with system of multiple motors primarily (or systems with motors and transformers) that have independent energizing circuits which act to set up progressive or shifting magnetic poles (i.e. the rotating magnetic field); Controls the speed of the motor.
21. U.S. patent 396,121 - Thermo Magnetic Motor - 1888 January 15 - Widely known that heat applied to a magnetic body will lessen its magnetizing ability; High enough temperatures will destroy the magnetic field; Mechanical power by a reciprocating action obtained from the joint action of heat, magnetism, and a spring or weight (or other force); In this patent, the application of heat to a body that is magnetized by induction or otherwise to the action of heat until the magnetism is neutralized to allow a weight or a spring to give action and lessen the action of the heat to restore the magnetic effect to move the body in the opposite direction.
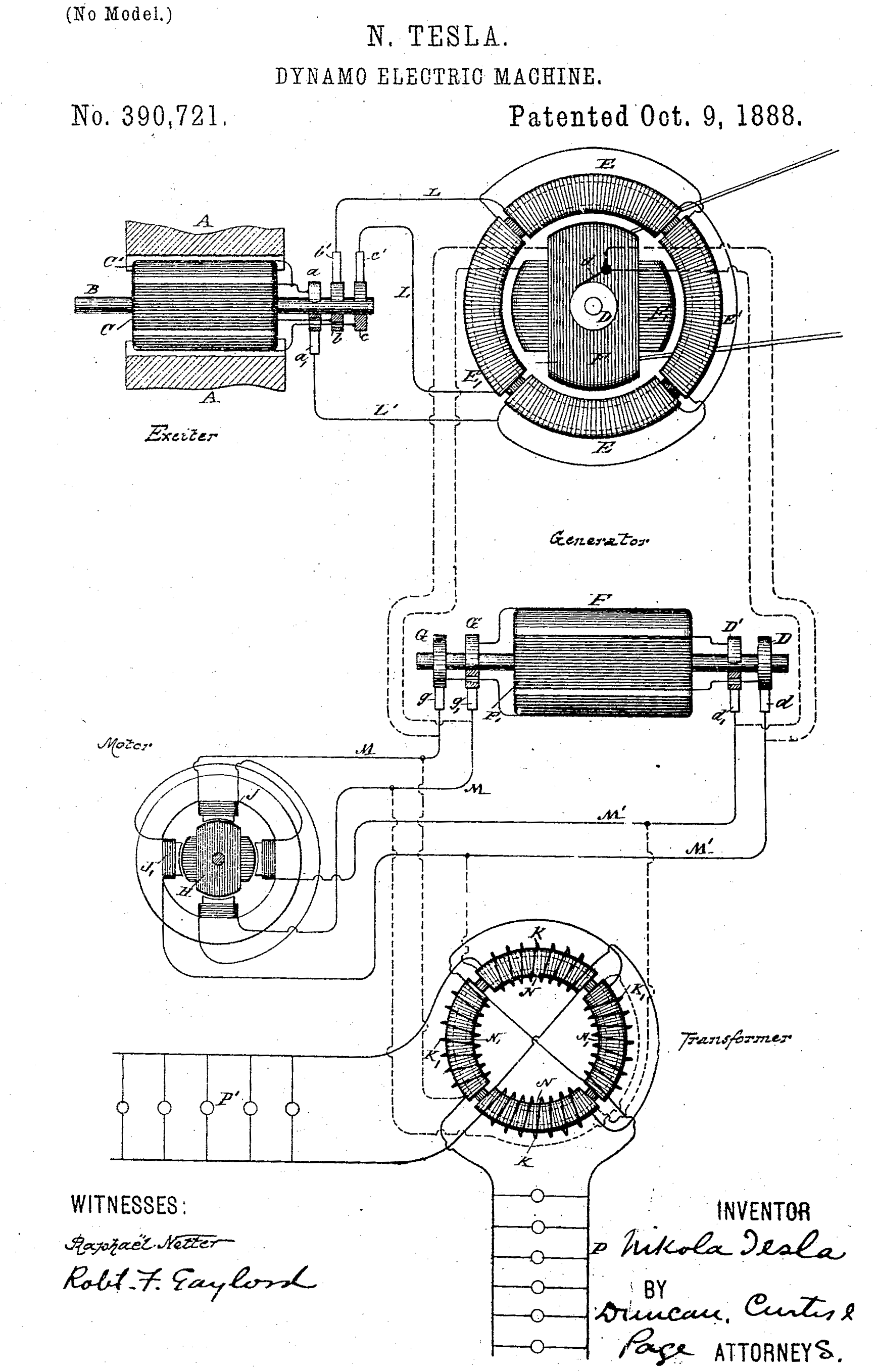
  Tesla's US390721 Patent for a "Dynamo Electric Machine"
22. U.S. patent 401,520 - Method of Operating Electro Magnetic Motors - 1889 April 16 - Improvements to previous instances of synchronous motors; Previous instances of synchronous motors have not been started by the alternating current generators; New discovery of simple method or plan of operating such motors; Requires no other device other than the motor itself; Conversion from a double circuit motor and which will start under the actions of an alternate current into a synchronizing-motor; synchronous motor definition.
23. U.S. patent 405,858 - Electro Magnetic Motor - 1889 June 25 - Torque, instead of being the result in the difference in the magnetic periods or phases of the poles or to the attractive parts to whatever due, is produce to the angular displacement of the parts which, though movable with the respect to one another, are magnetized simultaneously, or approximately so, by the same currents; Concerns the armature and the field laminations of the magnetic core for the greatest magnetic attractions; Best means to achieve these results.
24. U.S. patent 405,859 - Method of Electrical Power Transmission - 1889 June 25 - New and useful method of bringing up the motor to a desirable speed; Forms of alternating current machines, connected to alternating current generators, can be run as synchronous motor; Prior, alternating current will not start it; Construct a generator with two coils or sets of coils and connect them with a motor of corresponding coils or sets of coils; By means of two line wires, the motor and generator in like fashion; Related to US 390413 (for means of starting); Will operate as a single-circuit synchronizing system.
25. U.S. patent 406,968 - Dynamo Electric Machine - 1889 July 16 - Relates to class of machines referred to as "Unipolar" machine (i.e., a disk or cylindrical conductor is mounted in between magnetic poles adapted to produce a uniform magnetic field); Construction of a machine with two fields, each having a rotary conductor mounted between its poles; Discussed the disk form primarily; The direction of the magnetism or order of the poles in one field of force is opposite to that of the other, so the rotation of the disk in the same direction forms a field from the center to the circumference and another from the circumference to the center; Contacts applied to the shafts form terminals of a circuit to produce a sum of electromotive forces of the two disks; If direction of the fields are the same, driving the disks in the opposite direction will obtain the same results.
26. U.S. patent 413,353 - Method of Obtaining Direct current from Alternating Currents - 1889 October 22 - Superiority of alternating currents discussed; Delineates machines to convert alternating currents to direct (or continuous) currents at will at one or more points; Obtain direct currents from alternating currents; Active resistances to opposite electrical character, whereby the currents or current-waves of opposite character will be diverted through different circuits.
27. U.S. patent 416,191 - Electro-Magnetic Motor - 1889 December 3 - Induction motor with two or more energizing circuits; alternating currents of differing phases are passed to produce rotation or operation of the motor; simple way consists of two circuits; alternate way consists of one line that divides the alternating current in the motor circuit and effects an artificial lag in one of the circuit of branches (such as by a different induction capacity).
28. U.S. patent 416,192 - Method of Operating Electro-Magnetic Motors - 1889 December 3 - Related to US401520; Alternative improvements to synchronous motors; Torque and synchronous actions in motors; different field circuit of differing induction; Windings and shunts; Increases tendency to synchronize.
29. U.S. patent 416,193 - Electro-Magnetic Motor - 1889 December 3 - Induction motor operation with two or more windings; securing differing phase differences; Phase proportional to the induction and inverse to the resistance encountered by the current; one circuit (the energizing circuit) should have high induction and low resistance (along with possessing the greater length or number of turns) and the converse in the other (which has few turns of finer wire or wire that has higher resistance); magnetic quantities of the poles should be approximately equal; Self-induction cores are much longer.
30. U.S. patent 416,194 - Electric Motor - 1889 December 3 - Drawings include the motor seen in many of Tesla's photos; Classic alternating current electro-magnetic motor; Induction motor operation; Field and armature of equal strengths or magnetic quality; field and armature cores of equal amounts; Coils containing equal amount of copper.
31. U.S. patent 416,195 - Electro-Magnetic Motor - 1889 December 3 - Induction motor operation with two or more windings; Differing phases; Structural and operational conditions; Armature operation conditions and the obedience to the energizing circuit and stator; Construction and organization principles.
32. U.S. patent 417,794 - Armature for Electric Machines - 1889 December 24 - Construction principles of the armature for electrical generators and motors; Simple and economical; Coils of insulated conducting wire (or ribbon) may be wound or formed into bobbins; Position of the bobbins dictate the windings; Armature has polar projections and maximum core-surface exposure to the field magnetic poles; Related to other applicant patents, numbers US327797, US292077, GB9013.
33. U.S. patent 418,248 - Electro-Magnetic Motor - 1889 December 31 - Electric generator; Employment of an artificial cooling device; Enclosing the source of heat and that portion of the magnetic circuit exposed to the heat and artificially cooling the said heated part; Combination of an enclosed source of heat applied to a portion of said core; Magnetized core or body and a conductor within the field of force; Artificial cooling device for reducing the temperature of the heated portion thereof; Means for bringing a cooling gas or fluid in contact with the heated portion of the core, and means for controlling the admission of the same; The combination and coils wound thereon and a connection with a boiler for admitting steam into the channels, as set forth; Magnetized core containing passages or channels; Means for applying heat to a portion of the core.
34. U.S. patent 424,036 - Electro-Magnetic Motor - 1890 March 25 - Cites then common language of his motors referred to as the "magnetic lag" motors; Another form of the induction motor with two or more energizing circuits with differing phase differences are passed to produce rotation or operation of the motor; Magnetism lags electrical parts of energizing effects; Manifests these effect simultaneously and not successively; Related to US405858; Torque is produced to the angular displacement of parts; Best means to achieve these results; prefer the use of alternating currents.
35. U.S. patent 428,057 - Pyromagneto Electric Generator - 1890 May 13 - Electric generator; Employment of an artificial cooling device; Enclosing the source of heat and that portion of the magnetic circuit exposed to the heat and artificially cooling the said heated part; Combination of an enclosed source of heat applied to a portion of said core; Magnetized core or body and a conductor within the field of force; Artificial cooling device for reducing the temperature of the heated portion thereof; Means for bringing a cooling gas or fluid in contact with the heated portion of the core, and means for controlling the admission of the same; The combination and coils wound thereon and a connection with a boiler for admitting steam into the channels, as set forth; Magnetized core containing passages or channels; Means for applying heat to a portion of the core.
36. U.S. patent 433,700 - Alternating-Current Electro-Magnetic Motor - 1890 August 5 - Rotation of an electromagnetic motor is produced by the magnetic movements or the maximum of the pole's (or point's) magnetic effects from the conjoined actions (or the two energizing circuits) through which alternating currents (or similar rapidly varying currents) are passed through; Multiple magnets are powered by artificial currents; Inverse strength of magnetism on stator for best rotation; Creates multiple phases through one circuit from one power source.
37. U.S. patent 433,701 - Alternating-Current Motor - 1890 August 5 - Two sets of field-pole pieces of energized independently by the same source; Closed magnetic iron shunts or bridges in sets or series.
38. U.S. patent 433,702 - Electrical Transformer Or Induction Device - 1890 August 5 - Main magnetic core and the primary and secondary coils interposed by a magnetic shield or screen between the coils or around one of the coils; Coils can be wound upon or built up around the magnetic shield; Adapted to or capable of being magnetically saturated by a predetermined current strength below the maximum in the primary.
39. U.S. patent 433,703 - Electro-Magnetic Motor - 1890 August 5 - Describes the combination, in an alternating current motor, of an energizing coil and a core composed of two parts (one being protected from magnetization from the other one interposed between it and the coil); A rotating armature is motivated by the induced fields; Alternatively, a field magnet composed of a coil and core (with two sections in proximity of the coil and an inner section between the same); Also, a field magnet each composed of a coil and core (with two sections in proximity of the coil and an inner section between the same).
40. U.S. patent 445,207 - Electro-Magnetic Motor - 1891 January 27 - Describes the combination, in a motor, of a primary energizing circuit (connected to a generator) and a secondary circuit in inductive relation to the primary; Each circuit has a different electrical character, resistance, induction capability, or number and type of windings.
41. U.S. patent 447,920 - Method of Operating Arc-Lamps - 1891 March 10 - Abate or render inaudible sound emitted by arc lamps that are powered by (or supplied with) alternating currents by increasing the frequency of alternations (or pulsations) above the auditory level.
42. U.S. patent 447,921 - Alternating Electric Current Generator - 1891 March 10 - A generator that produces alternations of 15000 per second or more.
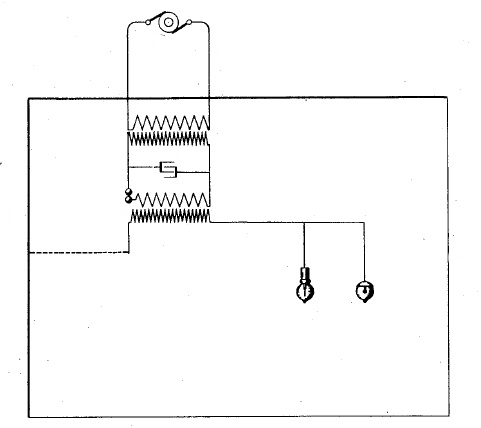
  454622 - System of Electric Lighting: Apparatus devised for the purpose of supplying electrical energy in a form suited for the production of certain phenomena, such as lighting. The first patent on the Tesla coil.
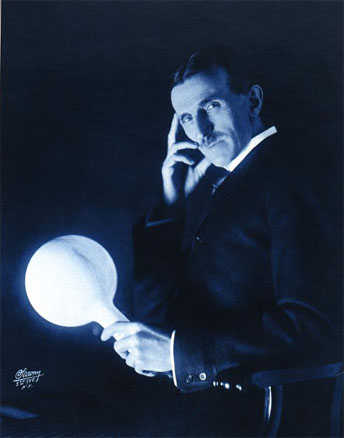
  Nikola Tesla holding a gas-filled phosphor-coated light bulb which was illuminated without wires by an electromagnetic field from the "Tesla Coil".
43. U.S. patent 454,622 - System of Electric Lighting - 1891 June 23 - Apparatus devised for the purpose of converting and supplying electrical energy in a form suited for the production of certain novel electrical phenomena, which require currents of higher frequency and potential. It specifies an energy storage capacitor and discharger mechanism on the primary side of a radio-frequency transformer.
44. U.S. patent 455,067 - Electro-Magnetic Motor - 1891 June 30 - Alternating current motor, with field magnets and energizing circuit armature-circuit and a core adapted to be energized by currents induced in its circuit by the currents in the field circuit; Condenser connected with or bridging the armature-circuit (e.g., the rotating element of the motor); Energizing circuit formed by coils wound thereon in a different inductive relations to the field and joined in a continuous or closed series; Combination of a condenser, the plates of which are connected, respectively, to the junctions of the circuits or coils.
45. U.S. patent 455,068 - Electrical Meter - 1891 June 30 - Method of computing the amount of electrical energy expended in a given time in an electrical circuit; Operates by maintaining by the current a potential difference between two conductors in an electrolytic solution (or cell) uniform throughout the whole extent of such conductors exposed to the solution; Measurement of the variation of the resistance in one or both conductors dues to the gain or loss of metal by electro-deposition; Electrolytic cell and conductors passing through the cell and connected in series with a translating device; One or more resistances connected with the conductors and cell for establishing a potential difference between the two conductors through the solution of the cell; Tubular cell contains electrolytic solution and closed at each end.
46. U.S. patent 455,069 - Electric Incandescent Lamp - 1891 June 30 - Incandescent lamp consisting of two isolated refractory conductors contained in a non-striking vacuum and adapted to produce light by incandescence; Globe or receiver exhausted to the non-striking point with two mounted isolated bodies (or metal wires) of refractory conducting material to emit light and sealed in; Terminal to connect with an electrical energy source; Refractory conducting material not to be rendered incandescent coated or covered with insulation.
47. U.S. patent 459,772 - Electro-Magnetic Motor - 1891 September 22 - Alternating current non-synchronizing electric motor coupled with a synchronizing alternating current motor whereby the former starts the latter and throws it into synchronism with its actuating current; Switch mechanism for directing the current through either or both of the motors; Combination of two motors (one an alternating current torque motor [e.g., shifting poles via the energizing circuit] and the other a synchronizing alternating current motor) the armatures of which are mounted upon the same shaft; Switching circuit directing the alternating current or currents through the several circuits of one motor or the single circuit of the other.
48. U.S. patent 462,418 - Method of and Apparatus for Electrical Conversion and Distribution - 1891 November 3 - Apparatus devised for the purpose of converting and supplying electrical energy in a form suited for the production of certain novel electrical phenomena which require currents of higher frequency and potential.
49. U.S. patent 464,666 - Electro-Magnetic Motor - 1891 December 8 - Alternating current motor provided with two or more energizing or field circuits; One circuit connected to current source and the other (or others) in inductive relation thereto; One circuit connected to alternating currents and the other constituting high potential secondary circuit; Condenser interposed in the inductive circuit.
50. U.S. patent 464,667 - Electrical Condenser - 1891 December 8 - Electrical condenser composed of plates or armatures immersed in oil; Plates or armatures can be adjustable.

=== Patents #51–#100 ===
51. U.S. patent 487,796 - System of Electrical Transmission of Power - 1892 December 13 - Alternating current generator consisting of independent armature-circuits formed by conductors alternately disposed; Currents developed differ in phase and the field magnet poles in excess of the number of armature-circuits; Motor having independent energizing circuits connected to the armature-circuit of the alternating current generator; Rotating magneto-electric machine yielding a given number of current impulses or alterations for each turn or revolution; Poles which in number are less than the number of current impulses produced in each motor-circuit by one turn or revolution; Multipolar alternating-current machine.
52. U.S. patent 511,559 - Electrical Transmission of Power - 1893 December 26 - Method of operating motors having independent energizing circuits; Passing alternating currents through circuits and retarding the phases of the current in one circuit to a greater extent; Directing alternating currents from a single source through both circuits of a motor and varying or modifying the relative resistance or self-induction of motor circuits, producing in currents differences in phases.
53. U.S. patent 511,560 - System of Electrical Power Transmission - 1893 December 26 - Motor having independent energizing circuits connected with a source of alternating currents; Means of rendering the magnetic effects to said energizing circuit of difference phase; Armature within the influence of the energizing circuit; Energizing circuits connected in derivation or multiple arc and of different active or variable resistance (or self-inductance); Pairs of mains connected and a multiple circuit differential phase; Change of time-period of currents passing through an electro-motive phase-changing device interposed between the mains and the destination; Includes a correction.
54. U.S. patent 511,915 - Electrical Transmission of Power - 1894 January 2 - Method of operating electro-magnetic motors; Passing alternating currents through one of the energizing circuits and inducing by such current in the other energizing circuit or circuits of the motor.
55. U.S. patent 511,916 - Electric Generator - 1894 January 2 - Combination with the piston or equivalent element of an engine which is free to reciprocate under the action thereon of steam or a gas under pressure, of the moving conductor or element of an electric generator in direct mechanical connection; Engine and generator being adjusted by their relative adjustment with respect to period to produce currents of constant period; Electric generator having inducing or induced elements one of which is capable of oscillation in the field of force, the movable element being carried by the piston rod of the engine; Relation as to respect of period of electrical vibration will not disturb the period of the engine; Cylinder and piston reciprocating by steam or gas under pressure of a spring maintained in vibration by the movement of the piston, and the electric generator, the movable conductor or element of which is connected with the piston; Method of constructing and adapting elements; Imparting the oscillation of an engine to the moving element of an electric generator and regulating the period of mechanical oscillation by adjustment of the reaction of the electric generator.
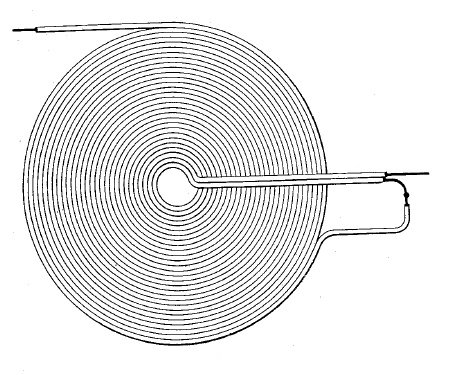
  512340: Coil for Electro-Magnets; bifilar coils.
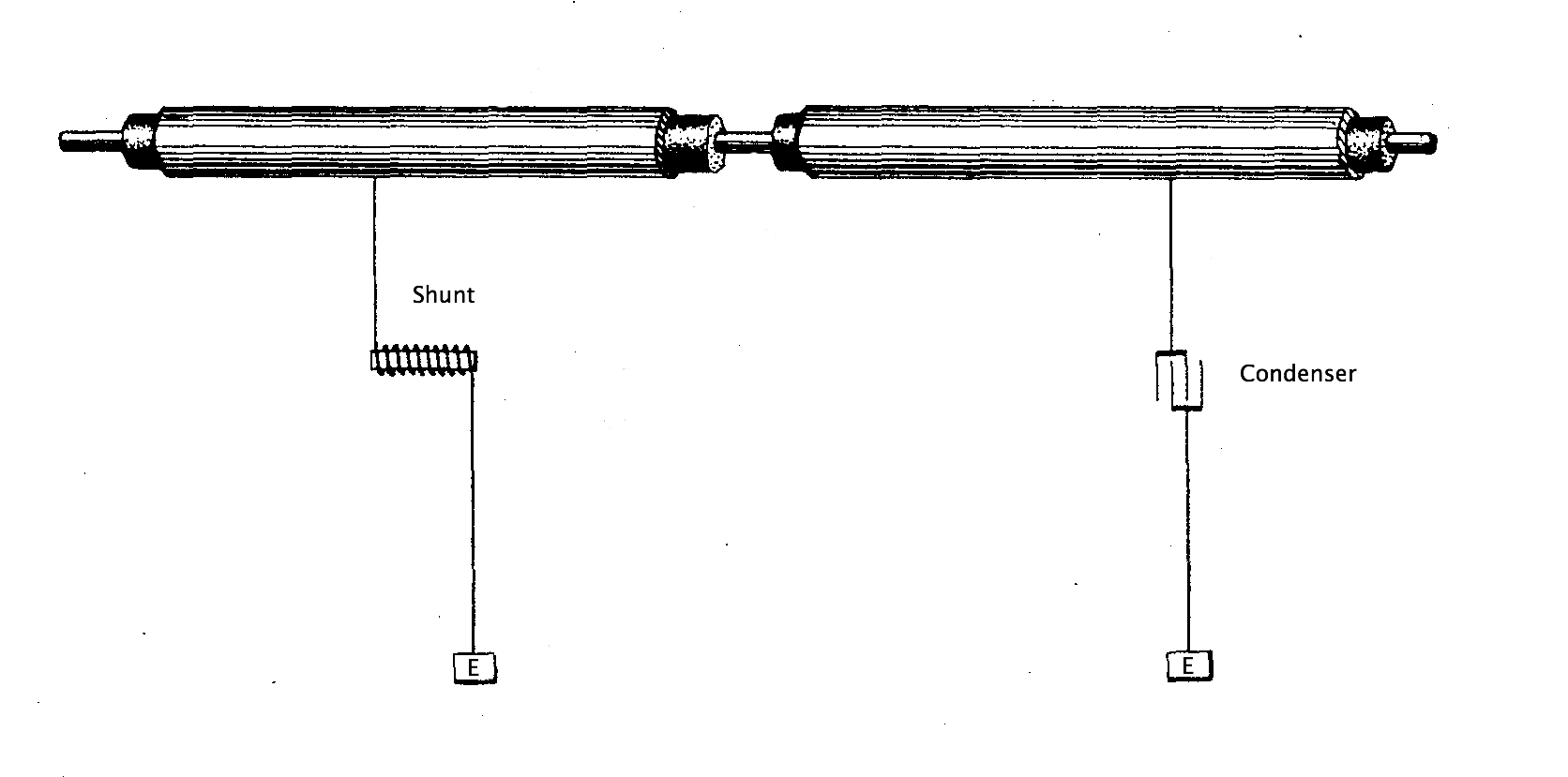
  Electrical conductor, 514167; Early example of coaxial cable.
56. U.S. patent 512,340 - Coil for Electro-Magnets - 1894 January 9 - Effect of mutual relation self-induction exploited; Adjacent coil convolutions formed parts exists so that the potential difference is sufficient to neutralize negative effects; Object to avoid expensive, cumbersome, and difficult condensers; Bifilar coil winding technique.
57. U.S. patent 514,167 - Electrical Conductor - 1894 February 6 - Prevent loss in line conductors; Insulate and encase conductors with a sheathing which is connected to the ground; Sheath or screen; Coaxial cabling.
58. U.S. patent 514,168 - Means for Generating Electric Currents - 1894 February 6 - Generating and utilizing electrical energy discovered by Tesla; related to US454622 and US462418; Maintenance of intermittent or oscillatory discharges of a condenser of suitable circuit containing translating devices; Discharges take place in insulating liquids (such as oil); Varying spark gap distances; Keep circulating flow in liquid; Illustrates preferred manner.
59. U.S. patent 514,169 - Reciprocating Engine - 1894 February 6 - Provide a means of engines, which under the applied forces such as elastic tension of steam or gas under pressure, that will yield constant oscillatory movements (in wide limits); Function is constant irrespective of the loads, frictional losses, or other factors (which degrade other engines); Convert pressure into mechanical power; Better at higher temperatures and pressures than previous engines; Same principles of this engine appear later in the modern gasoline motors of automobiles; often cited by enthusiasts as a version of the "earthquake machine."
60. U.S. patent 514,170 - Incandescent Electric Light - 1894 February 6 - Related to US454622; Incandescent electric lamps; Particular forms of the lamp in which a light giving small body or button of refractory material is supported by a conductor entering a very highly exhausted globe or receiver; Conducting screen surrounds the supporting conductor; Single node vacuum tube.
61. U.S. patent 514,972 - Electric Railway System - 1894 February 20 - Utilizes high potentials and high frequencies; Insulated and screened supply conductor along the line of travel; Induction bar or plate in inductive relation to the screened conductor and an electrical connection to the motor.
62. U.S. patent 514,973 - Electrical Meter - 1894 February 20 - Method of measuring the amount of electrical energy expended in a given time in an electric circuit of alternating currents; High tension discharge through a rarefied gas between two conductors; Computing from the amount of the particles thrown off from the conductors or one of the same by action of the discharge of the energy expended; Primary coil in series with a translating device; High tension secondary; Two carbon conductors sealed in an exhausted receiver and coated with an insulating material on three sides, one terminal of each conductor being connected to a terminal of a secondary.
63. U.S. patent 517,900 - Steam Engine - 1894 April 10 - Cylinder and reciprocating piston (with a spring) and controlling slide valve of an engine adapted to be operated by steam or a gas system under pressure of an independently controlled engine of constant period operating the said valve.
64. U.S. patent 524,426 - Electromagnetic Motor - 1894 August 14 - Alternating current motor with energizing coils adapted to be connected with an external circuit of cores of different magnetic susceptibility so as to exhibit differences of magnetic phase under the influence of an energizing current; Rotary armature of magnetic poles and coils adapted to be connected with the external circuit surrounding the same; Cores constructed of different size, length, mass, or material whereby their magnetic phase will differ in time.
65. U.S. patent 555,190 - Alternating Motor - 1896 February 25 - Related to US381968 and US382280; Mode and plan of operating electric dynamic motor generators by progressive shifting; Magneto-electric machine; Dynamo motor conversion with two independent alternating current circuits; Transmission of energy; Rotating magnetic field principles.
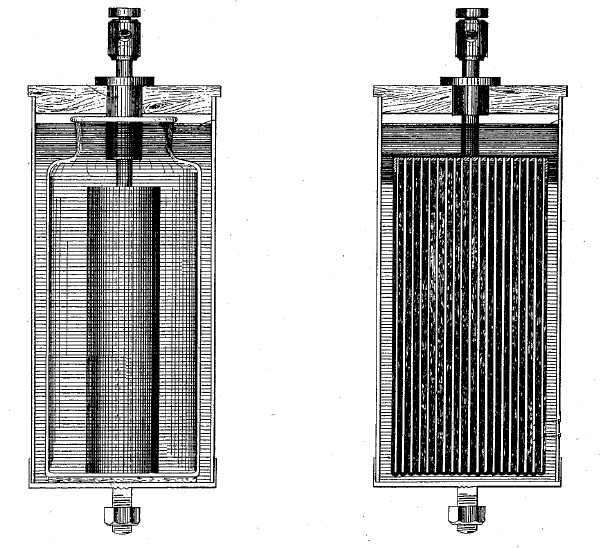
  567818: Electrical Condenser; Examples of improved capacitors.
66. U.S. patent 567,818 - Electrical Condenser - 1896 September 15 - Condenser constructed or provided with means for exclusion of air or gas; Armature composed of a conducting liquid; Armatures in two separate bodies of conducting liquid insulated electrically and contained in a receptacle; Insulating liquid seal on the surface of the conductive liquids.
67. U.S. patent 568,176 - Apparatus for Producing Electrical Currents of High Frequency and Potential - 1896 September 22 - Conversion of direct current into currents of high frequency. Combination of high self-inductance circuit, choking coil circuit controllers adapted to make and break the circuit, a condenser into which the back-emf discharges when interrupted, and a transformer through the primary of which the condenser discharges; Motor for driving the controller; 'Current of high electromotive force (voltage) which is induced at each break of the main circuit (back-emf) furnishes the proper current for charging the condenser (capacitor).'
68. U.S. patent 568,177 - Apparatus for Producing Ozone - 1896 September 22 - Primarily provides a simple, cheap, and effective apparatus for the production of ozone (or such gases); Obtained by the action of high-tension electrical discharges; Related to US462418 (November 3, 1891) and US454622 (June 23, 1891); In combination with a low self-induction and resistance circuit of direct currents, of a controller for making and breaking the same, a series-wound motor included in or connected with the charging-circuit and driving the controller; A condenser around the point of interruption in a circuit around the controller, and a transformer through the primary of which the condenser discharges (producing the potential necessary for such primary discharge and the coil raises the potential of such discharge) and which is in the discharge-circuit of the condenser; Device for maintaining a current of air between the discharge-surface; A fan-motor (maintaining a current of air between the discharge-surfaces) is connected with the charging-circuit.
69. U.S. patent 568,178 - Method of Regulating Apparatus for Producing Electric Currents of High Frequency - 1896 September 22 - Cited by Tesla in "the True Wireless" (illustrated in that article as Fig. 10) in the wireless field for the concatenated tuned circuits; regulates the energy delivered by a system for the production of high-frequency currents. It consists of a supply-side circuit whose current is diverted into a charging circuit of high self-induction, a condenser (charged by the supply circuit), another circuit (with low self-induction) which the same discharges through (and raises the potential of the condenser), and means for controlling the charging and the discharging of same, the said method consisting in varying the relation of the varying frequencies of the impulses in the circuit comprise the system.
70. U.S. patent 568,179 - Method of and Apparatus for Producing Currents of High Frequency - 1896 September 22 - used in the laboratory at New York, 35 South Fifth Avenue lab for employing currents of different phase; method for producing electric currents of high frequency, which consists in generating an alternating current, charging a condenser thereby during determinate intervals of each wave of said current, and discharging the condenser through a circuit of low self-induction; the combination with a source of alternating current, a condenser, a circuit-controller adapted to direct the current during determinate intervals of each wave into the condenser for charging the same, and a circuit of low self-induction into which the condenser discharges; the combination with a source of alternating current, a synchronous motor operated thereby, a charging-circuit in which the energy of said current is stored, a circuit-controller operated by the motor and adapted to interrupt the charging-circuit through the motor at determinate points in each wave, a condenser connected with the motor-circuit and adapted on the interruption of the same to receive the accumulated energy stored therein, and a circuit into which the condenser discharges.
71. U.S. patent 568,180 - Apparatus for Producing Electrical Currents of High Frequency - 1896 September 22 - an isochronous mechanical break used in the laboratory at New York, 35 South Fifth Avenue lab for employing currents of different; patent covers possible variations within Tesla's wireless systems; a combination with a source of alternating current, of a condenser adapted to be charged thereby, a circuit into which the condenser discharges in a series of rapid impulses and in synchronism with the source, and a circuit-controller for effecting the charge and discharge of said condenser, composed of a set of sub-divided conductors (a pair of angularly adjustable terminal and two or more rotating conductors) moveable into and out of proximity with (e.g., passing by) each other, whereby a spark may be maintained between them and the circuit closed thereby during determined intervals.
72. U.S. patent 577,670 - Apparatus for Producing Electric Currents of High Frequency - 1897 February 23. Two input circuits are each pulsed with a 25% duty cycle. Additionally, the brushes are phased so that the on states (discharges) never overlap. The output circuit has a toggled 50% output duty cycle, double the duration of the input pulse. Resultant back-emf is rectified to capacitors, and fed through a Tesla coil to a load.
73. U.S. patent 577,671 - Manufacture of Electrical Condensers, Coils and Similar Devices - 1897 February 23 - Improvements of condensers, transformers, self-induction coils, rheostats, and other similar devices; Used in areas where currents of high potentials are brought into close proximity; Method of excluding gas or air from the dielectric environment of such devices; Insulated material rendered fluid by heat; Material permeated the interstices of device and held under pressure; Material cooled and solidified under pressure.
74. U.S. patent 583,953 - Apparatus for Producing Currents of High Frequency - 1897 June 8 - Related to US568176; Conversion of electric current of ordinary character into high frequency and high potential; Can use either continuous (i.e., direct) or alternating currents.
75. U.S. patent 593,138 - Electrical Transformer - 1897 November 2 - Novel form of transformer or induction-coil and a system for the transmission of electrical energy by means of the same; Improvement of electrical transformers; Develops electric currents of high potential; Corrects construction principles heretofore manufactured; Higher potential for transmission than has ever been practically employed heretofore; Free from the danger of injury from the destruction of insulation; Safe to handle; High-frequency power supply for lighting and other applications.
76. U.S. patent 609,245 - Electrical Circuit Controller - 1898 August 16 - A circuit controller (see also 609245, 609246, 609247, 609250, 609251, 611719); Conductive fluid make and break circuit; Nozzle and conductor construction and their relative method of operation; Single source of power for operation; Nozzle and receptacle interaction; Combination of rotating receptacle and motor, a magnetic body in receptacle, and an exterior mounted magnetic body.
77. U.S. patent 609,246 - Electric Circuit Controller - 1898 August 16 - A circuit controller (see also 609245, 609246, 609247, 609250, 609251, 611719); Conductive fluid make and break circuit; Conductive liquid forming terminals; Two orifices with relative movement that can direct jets or streams; Two insulated compartments; Jets or streams are brought into intermittent contact.
78. U.S. patent 609,247 - Electric Circuit Controller - 1898 August 16 - A "circuit controller in which an independently-mounted terminal operated in a similar manner by a rotating body of conducting fluid may be enclosed within a gas-tight receptacle"; Conductive fluid make and break circuit; A combination of a closed receptacle containing a fluid, a method to rotate said receptacle, a mounted support, means for opposing or preventing the mount's movement in the same direction of the receptacle, and a terminal conductor in the support; Terminal capable of rotating about its axis or provided with rotating contacts; Fluid comprises the opposite terminal; Eccentric weight to a spindle; Rotating terminal connected with spindle; Receptacle mounted to rotate about an axis inclined to the vertical; Spindle inside receptacle; Weighted armature; Fluid is displace by centrifugal force.
79. U.S. patent 609,248 - Electric Circuit Controller - 1898 August 16 - A circuit controller (see also 609245, 609246, 609247, 609250, 609251, 611719) in which one terminal body moves through jets or streams intermittently and intercepts jets or streams; Conductive fluid make and break circuit; Rotary conductor; One terminal body moves through jets or stream intermittently and intercepts jets or streams; One rigid terminal receives directed jets or streams; Combination in a receptacle of a conducting disk and an insulated disk; Stationary tube or duct to direct jets or streams toward the conductor across the path of intermittent projections.
80. U.S. patent 609,249 - Electric Circuit Controller - 1898 August 16 - A circuit controller (see also 609245, 609246, 609247, 609250, 609251, 611719); Conductive fluid make and break circuit; Combination in a circuit controller with a closed rotary receptacle, of a rigid conductor mounted in the same and through which the circuit is intermittently established, and means for directing a jet of stream of a fluid which is contained in the receptacle, against the said body so as to affect its rotation independently of the receptacle; Rotary receptacle of a body or part mounted within the receptacle and concentrically mounted therewith, a conducting-terminal supported by said body and capable of rotation of the receptacle so as to oppose, by gyroscopic action, the rotation of the support, and means for directing a jet of conducting fluid against said terminal; A rotary receptacle of a support for a conductor mounted thereon concentrically with the receptacle and a gyrostatic disk carried by the support and adapted, when rotating, to oppose its movement in the direction of the rotation of the receptacle.
81. U.S. patent 609,250 - Electrical Igniter for Gas Engines - 1898 August 16 - Ignition system principles used today in automobiles; Operation of a machine that requires a spark, flame, or any other similar effect; More certain and satisfactory for use of and control by the machine or apparatus; Charging and discharging a condenser through switch or commutator.
82. U.S. patent 609,251 - Electric Circuit Controller - 1898 August 16 - A circuit controller (see also 609245, 609246, 609247, 609250, 609251, 611719). Circuit comprising, in combination, a receptacle containing fluid, means for rotating the receptacle, and a terminal supported independently of the receptacle and adapted to make and break electric connections; Receptacle contains a conductive and non-conductive fluid; Means of rotating the receptacle; Terminal adapted to make and break electrical connection with the conductive fluid within or under the non-conductive fluid.
83. U.S. patent 611,719 - Electrical Circuit Controller - 1898 October 4 - A circuit controller (see also 609245, 609246, 609247, 609250, 609251, 611719). Conductive fluid make and break circuit; The combination of a closed receptacle, of a circuit controller contained therein, and surrounded by an inert medium under pressure; Method of maintaining an inert atmosphere under pressure; Vessel containing a liquefied inert gas and method of communicating with the interior of the receptacle; One terminal is of a conductive fluid (such as mercury); Combination of conductors of series of conductors constituting one terminal of a circuit controller, means of maintaining a stream or jet of conductive fluid as the other terminal with which the conductor makes intermittent contact; Close receptacle containing terminal; Method of excluding oxygen from terminals; Motive device for rotating conductors; Force-pump in direct connection with conductor for maintaining a circulation of conducting fluid contained in the receptacle through the nozzle or nozzles; Rotating screw with conductor and extending into a well in which the fluid collects; Duct or ducts leading from the well to points from which the fluid will be direct against the rotating conductor; Magnetic core mounted on spindle.
84. U.S. patent 613,735 - Electric Circuit Controller - 1898 November 8 - A circuit controller (see also 609245, 609246, 609247, 609250, 609251, 611719). Conductive fluid make and break circuit; Combination with rigid and fluid conductors adapted to be brought intermittently into contact with each other; Means for imparting rotary motion to rigid and fluid conductors; Means to rotate by the movement of a fluid conductor.
85. U.S. patent 613,809 - Method of and Apparatus for Controlling Mechanism of Moving Vehicle or Vehicles - 1898 July 1 - Tesla "Boat" patent; Art of controlling the movements and operation of a vessel or vehicle at a distance; Electromagnetic waves conveyed to vessel by the natural media and rendering by their means the controlling-circuit active or inactive; New and useful improvements in methods of and apparatus for controlling from a distance; Solution for controlling from a given point the operation of mechanisms; No intermediate wires, cables, or other form of electrical or mechanical connection with the object save the natural media in space; explanation of most practical and effectual method and apparatus; Remote control.
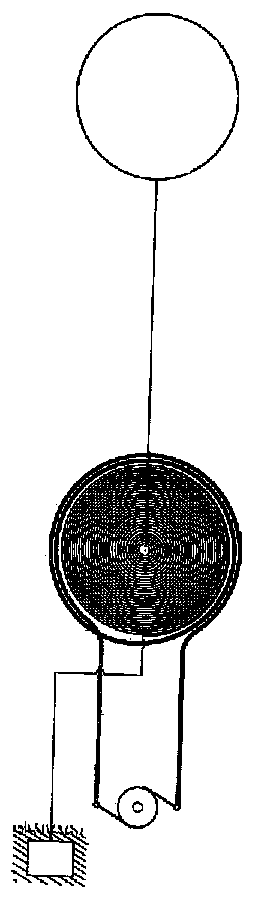
  Part of the drawing from Tesla's U.S. Patent 0,645,576 System of Transmission of Electrical Energy. The lower part is the generating coil and the upper part would have been a balloon supporting a conducting line at 30,000 feet.
86. U.S. Patent 645,576 - System of Transmission of Electrical Energy - 1900 March 20 - Wireless transmission of electric power;Tesla applied for this patent in September 1897 This wireless power transmission scheme consisted of transmitting power between two tethered balloons maintained at 30,000 feet, an altitude where he thought a highly conductive layer of the atmosphere would exist. He based the idea on the same low pressure conductivity phenomenon noticed in a Crookes tube. Tesla also thought the system could be used to "transmit intelligible messages to great distances" and thought the layer he energized would "illuminate upper strata of the air" providing nighttime lighting for people below.
87. U.S. Patent 649,621 - Apparatus for Transmission of Electrical Energy - 1900 May 15 - Related to US645576; New and useful combinations employed; Transmitting coil or conductor arranged and excited to cause currents or oscillation to propagate through conduction through the natural medium from one point to another remote point therefrom and a receiver coil or conductor of the transmitted signals; Production of currents of very high potential; Transmitting station and receiving station.
88. U.S. patent 655,838 - Method of Insulating Electric Conductors - 1900 October 23 - Method and practical application of insulation by freezing and solidification; Expounding on Faraday's hypothesis of freezing substances make them possess a higher dielectric level to insulate transmission conductors; Improvements in the method set out by Faraday; Method of insulating electrical conductors which consist in surrounding or supporting said conductors by a material which acquires insulating properties when frozen or solidified; Method of maintaining a conductor within a gaseous cooling agent by the continuous application of said agent; Trough or conduit with circulating cooling agents; Reissued as U.S. patent RE11865.
89. U.S. patent 685,012 - Means for Increasing the Intensity of Electrical Oscillations - 1900 March 21 - A method for producing a "great increase in the intensity and duration of the (electrical) oscillations excited in a freely-vibrating or resonating circuit by maintaining the same at a low temperature". Producing increase intensity and duration of electric oscillations; Combination of a circuit to possess freely vibrating excitations and of means for artificially cooling the circuit to a low temperature; Low temperature resonating circuit; Uses of electrical impulse oscillations; A circuit upon which oscillations are impressed, and which is adapted to vibrate freely, in combination with a receptacle containing an artificial refrigerant in which the circuit is immersed; Low resistance oscillators in a series of transmitting and receiving circuits in a system for the transmission of energy.
90. U.S. patent 685,953 - Apparatus for Utilizing Effects Transmitted from a Distance to a Receiving Device through Natural Media - 1901 November 5 - Heinriech Hertz methods cited; Induction method cited; Ground conduction method cited; Previous methods had limitations that result in great disadvantages for utilization; Wireless transmission developed by Tesla cited; Transmitting station coil arranged and excited to cause arbitrary or intermitted oscillation propagation to another remote point receiver station coil; Air is an excellent insulator; Air strata used for means of conduction for production of generating actions at a distance; Use of metallic conductor; Transmitting apparatus of signals or intelligence should produce effect as strong as possible; Charge a condenser or capacitor to utilize the potential energy.
91. U.S. patent 685,954 - Method of Utilizing Effects Transmitted through Natural Media - 1901 November 5 -Utilizing effects or disturbances transmitted through the natural media, which consists on charging a storage device with energy from an independent source, controlling the charging of said device by the actions of the effects or disturbances (during succeeding intervals of time determined by means of such effects and disturbances corresponding in succession and duration of the effects and disturbances), and coincidentally using the stored energy for the operating a receiving device; Independent source may be at a distant transmitting electrical energy; Receiving device circuit discharges the accumulated stored energy (which may be potential energy) and causing variations in resistance in a circuit including an independent source of electricity and a storage device; Effecting the storage (such as, in a condenser) during any desired time interval and under control of such effects of disturbances; Accumulated energy may operate a transformer (by discharging through a primary circuit at predetermined times) which, from the secondary currents, operate the receiving device.
92. U.S. patent 685,955 - Apparatus for Utilizing Effects Transmitted From A Distance To A Receiving Device Through Natural Media - 1901 November 5 - An apparatus for transmitting signals or intelligence through the natural media from a sending station to a distant point the combination of a generator or transmitter adapted to produce arbitrarily varied or intermitted electrical disturbances or effects in the natural media, and for utilizing electrical effects or disturbances transmitted through the natural media, the combination with a source of such effects of disturbances of a charging-circuit adapted to be energized by the action of such effects or disturbances, between which a difference of potential is created by such effects or disturbances, a storage device included in the charging-circuit and adapted to be charged thereby, a receiver, a means for commutating, directing, or selecting the current impulses in the charging circuit so as to render them suitable for charging the storage device, a device for closing the receiving-circuit, means for causing the receiver to be operated by the energy accumulated in the storage device at arbitrary intervals of time when connecting the receiving-circuit with the storage device for periods of time predetermined as to succession and duration, and means for discharging the storage device through the receiving-circuit at arbitrary intervals of time.
93. U.S. patent 685,956 - Apparatus for Utilizing Effects Transmitted through Natural Media - 1901 November 5 - Related to his Magnifying Transmitter; Used as part of Tesla's Colorado Spring receivers that posed a distributed high-Q helical resonators, radio frequency feedback, crude heterodyne effects, and regeneration techniques; an apparatus for transmitting signals or intelligence through the natural media from a sending station to a distant point the combination of a generator or transmitter adapted to produce arbitrarily varied or intermitted electrical disturbances or effects in the natural media; combination of a source of electricity, a transformer, a device normally of high resistance but adapted to have its resistance reduced when acted upon by the effects or disturbances, with a receiving circuit connected with a condenser and a deceived adapted to open and close the receiving circuit at predetermined intervals of time.
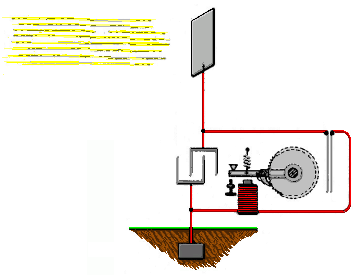
94. US685957 : Utilization of Radiant Energy
  U.S. patent 685,957 - Apparatus for the Utilization of Radiant Energy - 1901 November 5 - 4 illustrations; Radiation charging and discharging conductors; Radiations considered vibrations of ether of small wavelengths and ionize the atmosphere; Radiant energy throws off with great velocity minute particles which are strongly electrified; Rays or radiation falling on insulated-conductor connected to a condenser (i.e., a capacitor), the condenser indefinitely charges electrically; Radiation (or radiant energy) include many different forms; Related to US577671; Transmitted or natural energy can be used; Photoelectric stepping alternating current motors.
95. U.S. patent 685,958 - Method of Utilizing of Radiant Energy - 1901 November 5 - 2 illustrations; Ways of using radiation charging and discharging conductors; Rays or radiation falling on insulated-conductor connected to a condenser (i.e., a capacitor), the condenser indefinitely charges electrically; Radiation (or radiant energy) include many different forms; Related to US577671; Photoelectric stepping alternating current motors.
96. U.S. patent 723,188 - Method of Signaling - 1903 March 17 - Elevated transmitter capacitance; Coil; Earth electrode; Signal generator.
97. U.S. patent 725,605 - System of Signaling - 1903 April 14 - Elevated transmitter capacitance; Coil; Earth electrode; Signal generator; Apparatus of and method for electrical disturbance or impulses; Transmission of intelligent messages via wireless transmission; Govern the movement of distant automata.
98. U.S. patent 787,412 - Art of Transmitting Electrical Energy through the Natural Mediums - 1905 April 18 - Elevated transmitter capacitance; Coil; Earth electrode; Signal generator; Apparatus for generating and receiving electrical signals; Tuned resonant circuits; Physics of propagation; Non-Hertzian notes; Globe as conductor; Low frequency oscillations.
99. U.S. patent 1,061,142 - Fluid Propulsion - 1909 October 21 - Transmission and transformation of mechanical power through the agency of fluid; Propelled fluid moves in a natural path; Avoids losses; Easy; Simple.
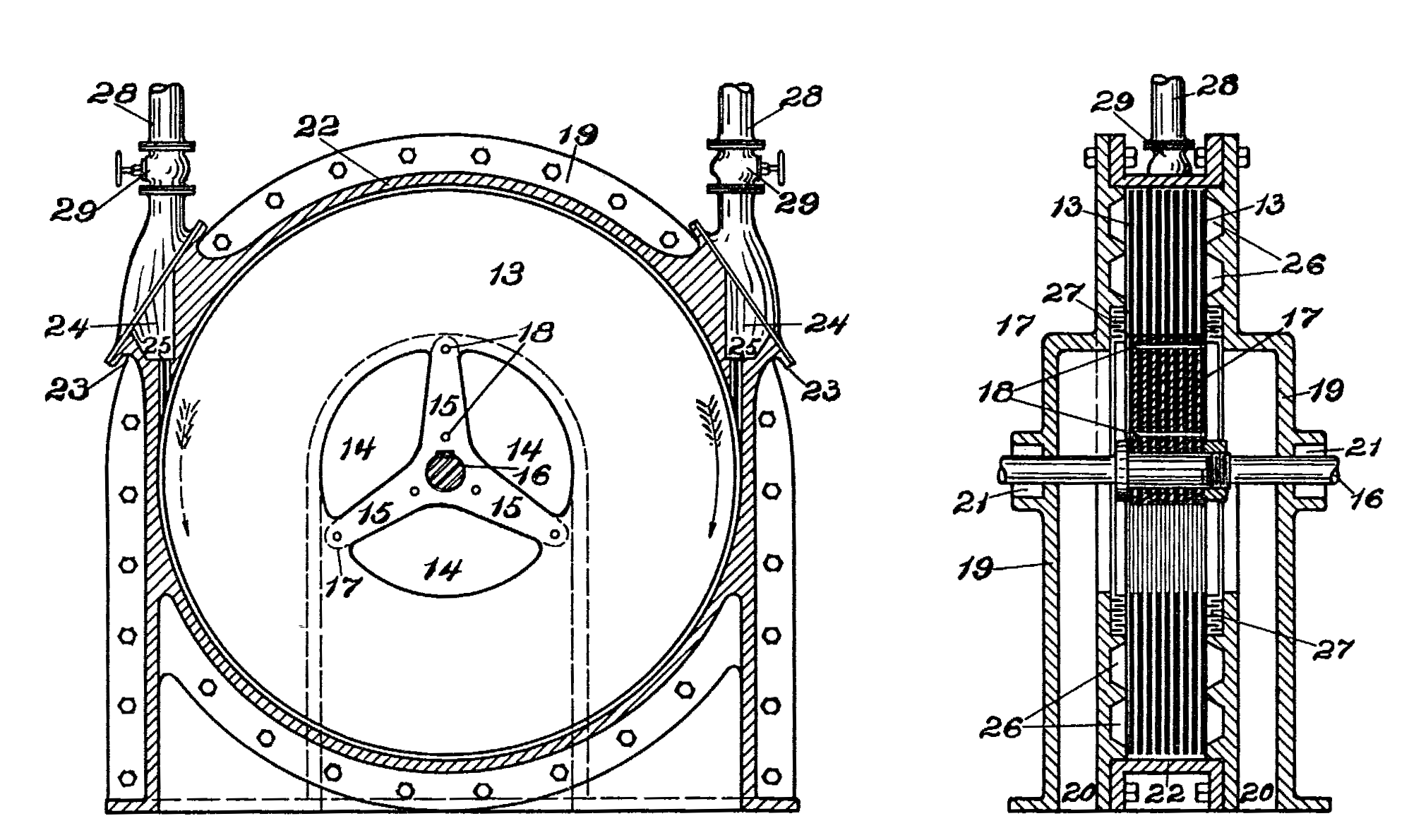
100. The "Bladeless" turbine design, Tesla's 100th American patent.
  U.S. patent 1,061,206 - Turbine - 1909 October 21 - Improvements in rotary engines and turbines; Mechanical power based on the vehicle of fluid for power; Known as the Tesla turbine; Bladeless turbine design; Utilizes boundary layer effect; Fluid does not impact the blades as in a conventional turbine.

=== Patents #101–#111 ===
101. U.S. patent 1,113,716 - Fountain - 1914 October 13 - Improvement in the construction of fountains and aquarium displays; Large mass of fluid in motion; Display of great power; Large displacement of fluid with little expense of energy.
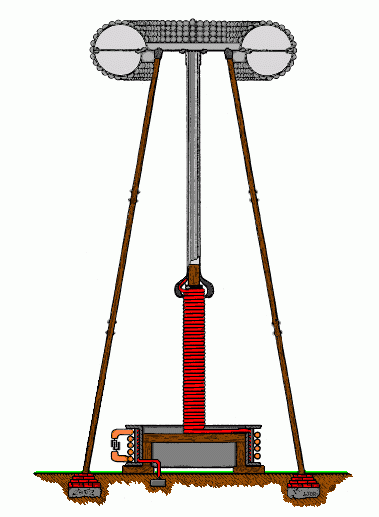
102. View in elevation Free terminal and circuit of large surface with supporting structure and generating apparatus
  U.S. patent 1,119,732 - Apparatus for Transmitting Electrical Energy - 1914 December 1 - High-voltage, air-core, self-regenerative resonant transformer; Oscillator for wireless transmission of electromagnetic energy; Tesla coil.
103. U.S. patent 1,209,359 - Speed-Indicator - 1916 December 19 - Improvement that uses the adhesion and viscosity of a gaseous medium [preferably air] to measure speed [or measure the torque-transmission] between indicator and driver; Durable; Simple; Inexpensive; Reliable.
104. U.S. patent 1,266,175 - Lightning-Protector - 1918 May 14 - Novel and advantageous construction of a protector in accord with the true character of the phenomena; Corrects Benjamin Franklin's hypothesis, and subsequent construction, for lightning protectors.
105. U.S. patent 1,274,816 - Speed Indicator - 1918 August 6 - Speedometer that possesses the feature of: Linearly proportional torque readings; Strong low speed torsional effects; not affected by atmospheric density, temperature, nor magnetic influences; Rugged; Simple; Economical.
106. U.S. patent 1,314,718 - Ship's Log - 1919 September 2 - Novel and advantageous construction of a ship's log; Instantaneous reading of knots or miles-per-hour.
107. U.S. patent 1,329,559 - Valvular Conduit - 1920 February 3 - Improvement by means of a conduit or channel characterized by valvular action; Conduit has baffles, recesses, projections, enlargements, or buckets that channels the flow's movement one way more efficiently; Mechanical diode; One-way valve with no moving parts. Now known as a Tesla valve.
108. U.S. patent 1,365,547 - Flow-Meter - 1921 January 11 - Related to the meter of measurement for velocity and quantity of fluid flow.
109. U.S. patent 1,402,025 - Frequency-Meter - 1922 January 3 - Ascertain the periodic electric frequency and electric oscillation by the rotation or reciprocation of an electromechanical device.
110. U.S. patent 1,655,113 - Method of Aerial Transportation - 1928 January 3 - VTOL aeroplane; Describes a method of achieved vertical take-off, transition to and from horizontal flight, and vertical landing, with a tilting rotor. Including transportation which consists in developing by the propelling device a vertical thrust in excess of the normal, causing thereby the machine to rise in an approximately vertical direction, tilting it and simultaneously increasing the power of the motor and thereby the propeller thrust, then gradually reducing the propeller thrust as forward speed is gained and the plane takes up the load, thus maintaining the lifting force sensibly constant during flight, tilting the machine back to its original position and at the same time increasing the power if the motor and thrust of the propeller and effecting a landing under the restraining action of the same.
111. U.S. patent 1,655,114 - Apparatus for Aerial Transportation - 1928 January 3 - VTOL aircraft; Includes a correction.

=== Reissued patent ===
1. U.S. patent RE11865 - Method of Insulating Electric Conductors - 1900 October 23 - Method of insulating electrical conductors which consist in surrounding or supporting said conductors by a material which acquires insulating properties when frozen or solidified; Method of maintaining a conductor within gaseous cooling agent by the continuous application of said agent; Trough or conduit with circulating cooling agents.

=== Anomalies ===
In various patent logs, it is recorded Tesla applied for US patent #613819 for "Filings Tube" (such as Charles Henry Sewall's "Wireless Telegraphy" (New York, 1904)) but it does not seem to have been issued. The Nikola Tesla Museum in Belgrade archives have Tesla prepared material and drawings for patents that he never registered.

== Other countries ==
The following is a list of other countries that hold known patents by Tesla. The number following the country is the number of known patents in their records. This is not an exhaustive list. The total number may be incomplete and additional countries still may hold patents unknown.

Country	Argentina	Australia	Austria	Belgium	Brazil	Canada	Cuba	Denmark	France	Germany	Hungary	India	Italy	Japan	Mexico	New Zealand	Norway	Rhodesia	Russia	Spain	Switzerland	Sweden	Transvaal	United Kingdom
Number	1	5	4	21	2	7	1	3	28	21	7	1	11	1	1	1	3	1	4	6	4	4	1	29

=== United Kingdom ===
- patent number - name of patent - date of application - notes on patent
1. GB1877 - Improvements in Electric Lamps - 1886 February 9
2. GB2801 - Improvements in Reciprocating Engines and Means for Regulating the Period of the same - 1894 February 8
3. GB2812 - Improvements in Methods of and Apparatus for the Generation of Electric Currents of Defined Period - 1894 February 8
4. GB2975 - Improvements in Dynamo Electric Machines - 1886 March 2
5. GB6481 - Improvements relating to the Electrical Transmission of Power and to Apparatus therefor - 1888 May 1
6. GB6502 - Improvements relating to the Generation and Distribution of Electric Currents and to Apparatus therefor - 1888 May 1
7. GB6527 - Improvements relating to Electro-motors - 1889 April 16
8. GB8200 - Improvements relating to the Transmission of Electrical Energy - 1905 April 17
9. GB8575 - Improved Methods of and Apparatus for Generating and Utilizing Electric Energy for Lighting Purposes - 1891 May 19
10. GB11293 - Improvements relating to the Utilization of Electromagnetic, Light, or other like Radiations Effects or Disturbances transmitted through the Natural Media and to Apparatus therefor - 1901 June 1
11. GB11473 - Improvements in Alternating Current Electro-magnetic Motors - 1891 July 6
12. GB12866 - Improvements in Electrical Circuit Controllers - 1898 June 8
13. GB13563 - Improvements in, and relating to, the Transmission of Electrical Energy - 1901 July 3
14. GB14550 - Improvements relating to the Insulation of Electric Conductors - 1900 August 14
15. GB14579 - Improvements in and relating to the Transmission of Electrical Energy - 1901 July 17
16. GB16709 - Improvements relating to the Conversion of Alternating into Direct Electric Currents - 1889 October 22
17. GB19420 - Improvements in Alternating Current Electro-magnetic Motors - 1889 December 3
18. GB19426 - Improvements in the Construction and Mode of Operating Alternating Current Motors - 1889 December 3
19. GB20981 - Improvements relating to the Production, Regulation, and Utilization of Electric Currents of High Frequency, and to Apparatus therefor - 1896 September 22
20. GB24001 - Improved Method of Imparting Energy to or Deriving Energy from a Fluid and Apparatus for use therein - 1910 October 17 - Bladeless turbine having disc rotors; Openings in the central portions and separating star-washers; Riveted into single, solid structure; Keyed to the shaft; Turbine or rotary engine.
21. GB24421 - Improvements in Systems for the Transmission of Electrical Energy and Apparatus for use therein - 1897 October 21
22. GB26371 - Improvements in the Method of and Apparatus for Controlling the Mechanism of Floating Vessels or Moving Vehicles - 1898 December 13
23. GB174544 - Improvements in Methods of and Apparatus for the Generation of Power by Elastic Fluid Turbines - 1921 April 1
24. GB179043 - Improved Process of and Apparatus for Production of High Vacua - 1921 March 24
25. GB185446 - Method of and Apparatus for Aerial Transportation - 1921 April 4
26. GB186082 - Improvements in the Construction of Steam and Gas Turbines - 1921 March 24 - Two heavier end-plate; Tapered toward the periphery; Reduces maximum centrifugal stress; Turbine.
27. GB186083 - Improved Method of and Apparatus for the Economic Transformation of the Energy of Steam by Turbines - 1921 March 24 - Improvements to increase efficiency of steam power plants and thermo-dynamic transformers; Producing motive power; Economical; Operable at very high temperature; Operable with cheap fuel; Avoids deteriorating actions previously common; System is related to the Tesla turbine.
28. GB186084 - Improved Process of and Apparatus for Deriving Motive Power from Steam - 1921 March 24
29. GB186799 - Process of and Apparatus for Balancing Rotating Machine Parts - 1921 September 2

=== Canada ===
- patent number - name of patent - date filed - notes on patent
1. CA24033 - Improvements in Dynamo Electric Machines - 1886 April 24
2. CA24348 - Electric Arc Lamp - 1886 June 18
3. CA29537 - Improvements in Methods of and Apparatus for the Electrical Transmission of Power - 1888 May 1
4. CA30172 - Improvements in Methods of and Apparatus for Converting and Distributing Electric Currents - 1888 May 1
5. CA33317 - Improvements in Methods and Apparatus for Converting Alternating into Direct Currents - 1889 December 19
6. CA135174 - Improvements in Fluid Propulsion - 1910 November 24 - Tesla Pump
7. CA142352 - Improvement in the Art of Transmitting Electrical Energy Through the Natural Media - 1906 April 17

=== France ===
	Patent number	Date of application	Equivalent US patent	Name of patent
1	FR190332	1888 May 1	US382282	Perfectionnements dans les procédés et appareils pour transformer et distribuer les courants électriques
2	FR190333	1888 May 1	US382280	Perfectionnements dans le mode de transmission de la force par l'électricité
3	FR197532	1889 April 16	US401520	Perfectionnements dans le mode de fonctionnement des moteurs électro-magnétiques à l'aide de courants alternatifs
4	FR201486	1889 October 22	US413353	Procédé de conversion des courants électriques alternatifs en courants continus
5	FR202372	1889 December 3	US416191	Perfectionnements dans les moteurs électro-magnétiques à courants alternatifs
6	FR202373	1889 December 3	US416192	Perfectionnements dans la construction et le mode de fonctionnement des moteurs à courants alternatifs
7	FR213556	1891 May 19	US454622	Procédé et appareil perfectionnés pour produire de la force électrique et l'utiliser pour l'éclairage
8	FR214718	1891 July 7	US455067	Perfectionnements dans les moteurs électro-magnétiques à courants alternatifs
9	FR236356	1894 February 17	US514169	Perfectionnements dans les machines à mouvement de va-et-vient et dans les mécanismes ou dispositifs destinés à en régler la période
10	FR236357	1894 February 17		Perfectionnements dans les moyens et appareils propres à produire des courants électriques de période déterminée
11	FR259940	1896 September 22		Perfectionnements relatifs à la production, au réglage et à l'utilisation des courants électriques de grande fréquence et aux appareils employés à cet effet
12	FR271641	1897 October 25		Perfectionnements dans les systèmes de transmission de l'énergie électrique et dans les appareils employés à cet effet
13	FR279362	1898 July 1		Perfectionnements aux contrôleurs de circuits électriques
14	FR284352	1898 December 24		Perfectionnements dans le procédé et les appareils de réglage pour les mécanismes des bâtiments flottants ou des véhicules en marche
15	FR303025	1900 August 14		Perfectionnements à l'isolement des conducteurs électriques
16	FR311629	1901 Juni 10		Perfectionnements à l'utilisation des variations ou changements d'état électriques ou d'ordres vibratoires similaires transmis à travers les milieux naturels, et appareils pour leur mise à exécution
17	FR312783	1901 July 17		Perfectionnements à la transmission de l'énergie électrique
18	FR313188	1901 August 2		Perfectionnements à la transmission de l'énergie électrique
19	FR354791	1905 October 12	US649621	Improvements to the transmission of electrical energy
20	FR421543	1911 February 24		Process and apparatus for the production and use of motive power by means of fluids
21	FR515388	1921 March 31		Fountain Enhancements
22	FR540616	1922 July 13		Driving as a valve
23	FR540617	1922 July 13		Enhancements to lightning conductors
24	FR541113	1922 July 22		Method and apparatus for balancing rotating machine parts
25	FR549259	1923 February 6		Process and apparatus for economic conversion of steam energy by means of turbines
26	FR549260	1923 February 6		Method and apparatus for using steam as a driving force
27	FR549261	1923 February 6		Method and apparatus for producing a high vacuum
28	FR549628	1923 February 15		Method and apparatus for air transport

=== Spain ===
- patent number - name of patent - date of application - notes on patent
1. ES23742 - Mejoras en el sistema de gobierno del mecanismo de recipientes o barcos flotantes o vehículos móviles por medio de los aparatos que se describen - 1899 January 31
2. ES26430 - Mejoras en el aislamiento de conductores eléctricos - 1900 August 14
3. ES26801 - Mejoras en el aislamiento de conductores eléctricos - 1900 November 6
4. ES49122 - Mejoras introducidas en los motores actuados por fluidos - 1910 October 21
5. ES81244 - Un procedimiento, con su aparato correspondiente para la obtención de fuerza motriz por medio de turbinas de fluidos elásticos. - 1922 March 31
6. ES81253 - Un método, con su aparato correspondiente para transportes aéreos - 1922 April 3

== Un-patented devices and projects ==
Devices and projects Tesla proposed and partially designed but did not patent.

- World Wireless System: proposed telecommunications and electrical power delivery system incorporating several of Tesla's patents.
- Teleforce: proposed defensive weapon system using pellets or slugs of material accelerated to a high velocity inside a vacuum chamber via electrostatic repulsion and then fired them out of aimed nozzles at intended targets.

== See also ==
- Tesla turbine
- Tesla coil
- The Complete Patents of Nikola Tesla (book)
