= Paul Eldridge =

American poet (1888–1982)

Paul Eldridge (May 5, 1888 – July 26, 1982) was an American poet, novelist, short story writer and teacher.

The son of Leon and Jeanette Eldridge (née Lafleur), he was born in Bucharest, Romania, on May 5, 1888 and immigrated with his family to the United States on August 15, 1900. He later married a fellow writer, Sylvette de Lamar (author of a 1932 novel Jews With the Cross). He received his B.S. from Temple University in 1909, his A.M. from the University of Pennsylvania in 1911, and a doctorate from the University of Paris in 1913. He was a teacher of romance languages at the high school level in New York until his retirement in 1945. He was a lecturer on American Literature at the Sorbonne in 1913 and at the University of Florence in 1923. He later was an instructor of English literature at Saint John's College in Philadelphia, from 1910 to 1912, and was a member of the Authors' and Dramatists' League of the Authors' Guild of America.

He is best known for collaborating with the American decadent novelist and poet George Sylvester Viereck, who was imprisoned as a Nazi agent in the 1940s, on a trilogy of exotic fantasy novels from 1928 to 1932, My First Two Thousand Years: the Autobiography of the Wandering Jew, Salome: the Wandering Jewess and the Invincible Adam. A highly prolific author, he had many of his later books published by E. Haldeman-Julius in his "Big Blue Books" series. He died at the age of 94 in a New York City nursing home on July 26, 1982.

== Bibliography ==
- Life Throbs (1911)
- Vanitas (1920)
- And the Sphinx Spoke (1921)
- Our Dead Selves: Anthology of the Lowly (1923)
- Irony and Pity: a Book of Tales (1926)
- The Intruder (1928)
- My First Two Thousand Years: the Autobiography of the Wandering Jew (With George Sylvester Viereck, 1928)
- Salome: the Wandering Jewess (With George Sylvester Viereck, 1930)
- Cobwebs and Cosmos (1930)
- The Invincible Adam (With George Sylvester Viereck, 1932)
- One Man Show (1933)
- Prince Pax (With George Sylvester Viereck, 1933)
- If After Every Tempest (1941)
- Madonna with the Cat: a Romantic Satire (1942)
- Horns of Glass (1943)
- He Who Loved His Neighbors and Other Stories (1945)
- I Bring a Sword (1945)
- Lanterns in the Night (1945)
- Lovers' Gifts and Other Stories (1945)
- The Last Supper of Marianne and Other Stories (1945)
- The Truth About Phyllis Warren and Other Stories (1945)
- Virgins and Other Stories (1945)
- Women Ain't No Fools and Other Stories (1945)
- Leaves From the Devil's Tree: A Smiling Cynic Looks at the Passing Show (1946)
- New York: This Whale of a City (1946)
- New York: The Empire State (1946)
- Two Lessons in Love: Master of hearts; Mr. Lowell and the Goddess (1946)
- A Lesson in Love (1946)
- Gamblers in Love and Other Stories (1946)
- Leaves from the Devil's Tree: a Smiling Cynic Looks at the Passing Show (1946)
- Men and Women: Stories of Love (1946)
- The Greatest Show on Earth: the Diary of a New York High School Teacher (1946)
- The Hudson: The River of Destiny 1946)
- The Jester's Holiday : a Divine Comedy (1946)
- The Way of Men with Maids and Other Stories (1946)
- Virtue, Beware! And Other Stories (1946)
- And Thou Shalt Teach Them (1947)
- Misadventure in Chastity: Antics and Romantics (1947)
- One Night: a Novel of Love in Nova Scotia (1947)
- The Whip and the Rose (1947)
- The Bed Remains: a Biography in Ten Chapters (1948)
- Blue Flames: Notes from the Diary of an Immoralist (1948)
- The Professor Goes Adventuring (1948)
- Moon Nets of the Master Spider (1948)
- Listen to Their Lust (1949)
- Curtain Call (1950)
- Flesh of the Flesh and Other Stories (1950)
- Maxims are Gadflies: The Wit and Wisdom of Paul Eldridge (1950)
- Anatole France: Master of Irony and Pity (1950)
- Erasmus: the Humanist (1950)
- Michel De Montaigne: Skeptic and Atheist (1950)
- The Kingdom Without God: Being the Last Will and Testament of Paul Eldridge (1951)
- Crown of Empire: The Story of New York State (1957)
- Tales of the Fortunate Isles (1959)
- Second Life of John Stevens (1960)
- Seven Against the Night (1960)
- The Tree of Ignorance (1962)
- Maxims for a Modern Man (1965)
- The Homecoming: a Chronicle of a Refugee Family (1966)
- The Parables of Old Cathay (1969)
- The Story-Tellers (1970)
- François Rabelais: the Great Story Teller (1971)
