= Fragments of Olympian Gossip =

Poem written by Nikola Tesla

"Fragments of Olympian Gossip" is a poem that Nikola Tesla composed in the late 1920s for his friend the German poet and mystic George Sylvester Viereck. It made fun of the scientific establishment of the day.

While listening on my cosmic phone
I caught words from the Olympus blown.
A newcomer was shown around;
That much I could guess, aided by sound.

"There's Archimedes with his lever
Still busy on problems as ever.
Says: matter and force are transmutable
And wrong the laws you thought immutable."

"Below, on Earth, they work at full blast
And news are coming in thick and fast.
The latest tells of a cosmic gun.
To be pelted is very poor fun.
We are wary with so much at stake,
Those beggars are a pest—no mistake."

"Too bad, Sir Isaac, they dimmed your renown
And turned your great science upside down.
Now a long haired crank, Einstein by name,
Puts on your high teaching all the blame.
Says: matter and force are transmutable
And wrong the laws you thought immutable."

"I am much too ignorant, my son,
For grasping schemes so finely spun.
My followers are of stronger mind
And I am content to stay behind,
Perhaps I failed, but I did my best,
These masters of mine may do the rest.
Come, Kelvin, I have finished my cup.
When is your friend Tesla coming up."

"Oh, quoth Kelvin, he is always late,
It would be useless to remonstrate."

Then silence—shuffle of soft slippered feet—
I knock and—the bedlam of the street.

Nikola Tesla, Novice
