= George Sylvester Viereck =

American poet, journalist, and pro-German propagandist (1884–1962)

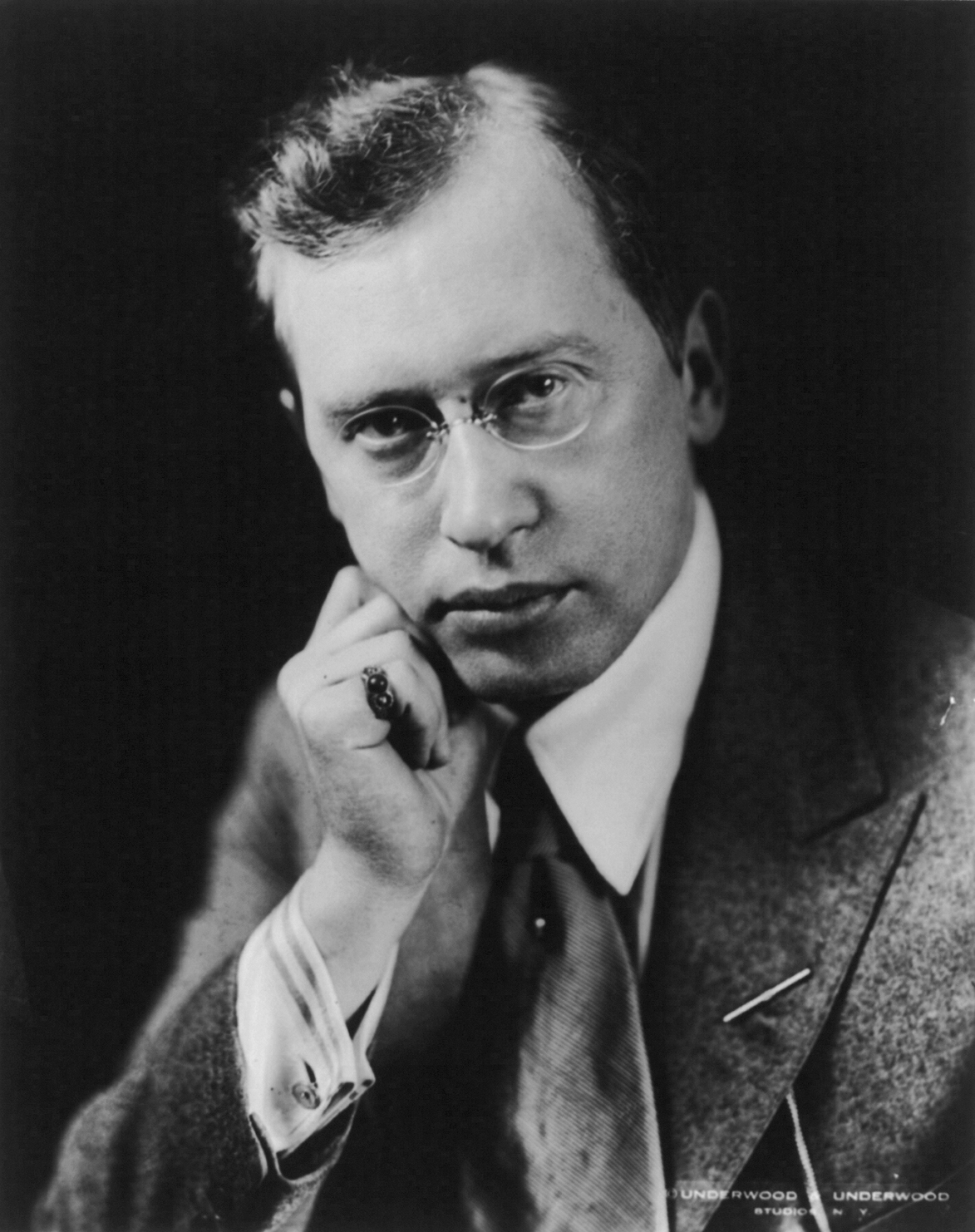
- Portrait of Viereck, by Underwood & Underwood, 1922
- Born: George Sylvester Viereck; December 31, 1884; Munich, Kingdom of Bavaria German Empire
- Died: March 18, 1962 (aged 77); Holyoke, Massachusetts, United States
- Occupations: Journalist; novelist; essayist; pro-German propagandist
- Spouse: Margaret Hein (m. 1915)
- Children: 2, including Peter Viereck
- Writing career
- Genre: Poetry

George Sylvester Viereck (December 31, 1884 – March 18, 1962) was a German-born American immigrant poet and journalist. After enjoying early success for his poetry, novels, and journalistic work, he achieved notoriety in the United States as a pro-German propagandist, and eventually as an agent operating on behalf of Nazi Germany. During World War II, he was convicted of violating the Foreign Agents Registration Act and served nearly four years in the Lewisburg Federal Penitentiary.

== Biography ==
=== Early life and education ===
George Sylvester Viereck was born in Munich on 31 December 1884. His father, Louis Viereck, had been born in Berlin in 1851 to the unmarried actress Edwina Viereck. It was rumored that Louis was the son of Kaiser William I. However, Louis von Prillwitz, from the Prince Augustus lineage in Prussia, acknowledged Louis as his son. Louis joined the Socialist Party in 1870, and eight years later was banished from Berlin under Otto von Bismarck's Anti-Socialist Laws. In 1881, he became editor of a socialist periodical in Munich. In 1884, he was elected to the Reichstag, but was imprisoned in 1886 for attending Socialist Party meetings. He left the Party upon his release from prison.

George's mother, Laura Viereck, was born in San Francisco to William Viereck, a younger brother of Edwina Viereck. William was an unsuccessful revolutionary who had fled the German States like other Forty-Eighters and operated a German theatre in San Francisco. After William's death in 1865, his wife returned to Germany with their children. In 1881, Laura married her first cousin Louis.

Louis emigrated to the United States in 1896, and Laura followed some months later with the eleven-year-old George, who preferred going by his middle name "Sylvester". As an adolescent, Sylvester was already writing poetry. His heroes were Jesus Christ, Napoleon Bonaparte, and Oscar Wilde. His 1907 novel The House of the Vampire was heavily influenced by Wilde's The Importance of Being Earnest. By 1901, Louis had become an American citizen. While still in college in 1904, young Viereck published his first poetry collection after obtaining the help of literary critic Ludwig Lewisohn. Viereck graduated from the College of the City of New York in 1906.

=== Early career and World War I ===
The next year, Viereck's collection Nineveh and Other Poems (1907) won him national fame. A number of his poems were written in the style of the Uranian male love poetry of the time. The Saturday Evening Post called Viereck "the most widely-discussed young literary man in the United States today".

In 1910, Viereck published a best-selling book of journalism, Confessions of a Barbarian, after it had appeared serially in the weekly magazine The Mirror. In that same year, he co-founded and edited a literary and arts journal called The International. Among its contributors was his close friend, American poet Blanche Shoemaker Wagstaff, as well as British occultist and poet Aleister Crowley.

In the years leading up to 1911 when his father returned to Germany to spend the remainder of his life, Viereck had himself become a Germanophile. He lectured on American poetry at the University of Berlin in 1911. He edited a German-sponsored weekly magazine, The Fatherland, with a claimed circulation of 80,000. The magazine was later renamed Viereck's American Weekly. For his advocacy of German militarism, and American pacifism, during World War I, Viereck was expelled from several social clubs and fraternal organizations, and had a falling out with Wagstaff.

After a German torpedo sank the Lusitania, Viereck released a statement in support of the attack. He once left a briefcase of German government documents on a train in Manhattan. A federal agent, who was tailing Viereck, quickly snatched the briefcase. Some of the documents were leaked to the New York World. When published, they revealed a long list of American citizens—including Viereck—who had received payment from the German government to sway public opinion in its favor. They also described German sabotage plans. Theodore Roosevelt (whom Viereck's father had helped to elect president) wrote him an angry letter encouraging him to leave the U.S. and go back to Germany. In August 1918, a lynch mob stormed Viereck's house in Mount Vernon, forcing him to seek refuge in a New York City hotel. His pro-German loyalties during the Great War tarnished his reputation as a respected American author. In 1919, he was expelled from the Poetry Society of America.

=== International success ===
In the 1920s, Viereck sought to revive his career as a writer and public figure. In 1923, he published a book of popular science entitled Rejuvenation: How Steinach Makes People Young. It drew the attention of Sigmund Freud, who wrote Viereck asking if he would write a similar book about psychoanalysis. Viereck traveled to Vienna to interview Freud, and then went to Munich to interview Adolf Hitler. During the mid-1920s, Viereck went on several additional tours of Europe, interviewing Marshal Foch, Georges Clemenceau, George Bernard Shaw, Oswald Spengler, Benito Mussolini, Queen Elisabeth of the Belgians, Henry Ford, Albert Moll, Magnus Hirschfeld, Albert Einstein, and Sigmund Freud. He first met Hitler through this interview series, describing him as a "human explosive."

Viereck developed a friendship with Nikola Tesla. Tesla occasionally attended dinner parties held by Viereck and his wife. He dedicated his poem "Fragments of Olympian Gossip" to Viereck, a work in which Tesla ridiculed the scientific establishment of the day.

=== Support for Hitler ===
Viereck became a well-known supporter of the Nazi movement. In 1933, he traveled to Berlin to meet with Hitler, who was then Chancellor of Germany. In 1934, Viereck gave a speech to twenty thousand "Friends of the New Germany" at New York's Madison Square Garden. He compared Hitler to Franklin Roosevelt and told the audience to sympathize with Nazism without being anti-Semites. His Jewish friends denounced him as "George Swastika Viereck", but he continued to promote Nazism.

In 1940, Viereck launched a scheme in which he "paid members of Congress to take propaganda from the Hitler government — he'd literally get it from the German embassy — and deliver it in Congress in floor speeches. Then he'd use their offices' franking privileges to get thousands, in some cases millions, of reprints of this Nazi propaganda. He would mail it out, at taxpayer expense, all over the United States." The key members of Congress working with Viereck in this scheme were Sen. Ernest Lundeen, Rep. Hamilton Fish, and Rep. Jacob Thorkelson.

In October 1941, Viereck was indicted in the U.S. for a violation of the Foreign Agents Registration Act when he set up his publishing house, Flanders Hall, in Scotch Plains, New Jersey. In 1942, he was convicted of failing to register with the U.S. Department of State as a Nazi agent and sentenced to 2 to 6 years in prison. In 1943, his conviction was reversed by the Supreme Court. Later that year, however, Viereck was convicted on six counts and sentenced to 1 to 5 years in prison. Viereck, who returned to prison on July 31, 1943, spent 3 years and 10 months in the Federal Penitentiary in Lewisburg, Pennsylvania. He was released on parole on May 17, 1947.

=== Postwar ===
Viereck's chronicle of life in prison, Men Into Beasts, was published as a paperback originally by Fawcett Publications in 1952. The book is a memoir of discomfort, loss of dignity, and brutality in prison. The front matter and backcover text focus on the situational homosexuality and male rape described in the book which Viereck claims to have witnessed, but not experienced.

On March 18, 1962, George Sylvester Viereck died at Mount Holyoke Hospital in Holyoke, Massachusetts. He was 77.

== Family ==
In 1915, Viereck married Margaret Edith Hein. They had two sons, George and Peter. George was killed in action during the Second World War. Their other son, Peter, became a Pulitzer Prize-winning poet, historian, and conservative political theorist. A 2005 New Yorker article discusses how Peter Viereck both rejected and was shaped by the ideologies of his father.

== Reception ==
The poem "Slaves" published in the 1924 collection The Three Sphinxes and Other Poems inspired the title of the 1968 psychothriller Twisted Nerve, and is quoted several times in the film:

A twisted nerve, a ganglion gone awry,
Predestinates the sinner and the saint.

Viereck's The House of the Vampire (1907) was not well received by critics. In 1909, Edgar Allan Woolf loosely based his stage play, The Vampire, on Viereck's novel.

== Bibliography ==
- (1906) A Game at Love, and Other Plays. New York: Brentano's.
- (1907) The House of the Vampire. New York: Moffat, Yard & Company. Audiobook available.
- (1907) Nineveh and Other Poems. New York: Moffat, Yard & Company.
- (1910) Confessions of a Barbarian. New York: Moffat, Yard & Company.
- (1912) The Candle and the Flame. New York: Moffat, Yard & Company.
- (1916) Songs of Armageddon and Other Poems. New York: Mitchell Kennerley.
- (1919) Roosevelt: A Study in Ambivalence. New York: Jackson Press, Inc.
- (1923) Rejuvenation: How Steinach Makes People Young. New York: Thomas Seltzer [as George F. Corners].
- (1924) The Three Sphinxes and Other Poems. Girard, Kansas: Haldeman-Julius Company.
- (1928) My First Two Thousand Years: The Autobiography of the Wandering Jew. New York: The Macaulay Company [with Paul Eldridge].
- (1930) Glimpses of the Great. New York: The Macaulay Company.
- (1930) Salome: The Wandering Jewess. My First 2,000 Years of Love. New York, Liveright.
- (1930) Spreading Germs of Hate. New York: Liveright [with a foreword by Colonel Edward M. House].
- (1931) My Flesh and Blood. A Lyric Autobiography, with Indiscreet Annotations. New York: Liveright.
- (1932) The Invincible Adam. London: Gerald Duckworth & Co. [with Paul Eldridge].
- (1932) The Strangest Friendship: Woodrow Wilson and Colonel House. New York: Liveright.
- (1937) The Kaiser on Trial. New York: The Greystone Press.
- (1938) Before America Decides. Foresight in Foreign Affairs. Cambridge, Mass.: Harvard University Press [with Frank P. Davidson].
- (1941) The Seven Against Man. Flanders Hall.
- (1949) All Things Human. New York: Sheridan House [as Stuart Benton].
- (1952) Men into Beasts. Fawcett Publications.
- (1952) Gloria: A Novel. London: Gerald Duckworth & Co; republished in 1953 as The Nude in the Mirror. New York: Woodford Press.

=== Articles ===
- (1910) "Some Reminiscences of Richard Watson Gilder", The Forum 43, pp. 73–78.
- (1922) "Would-Be Assassins", The American Monthly 14 (1), pp. 5–6.
- (1929) "At the Threshold of the Invisible", Ghost Stories 6 (1).
- (1929) "Spirits in the Laboratory", Ghost Stories 6 (5).

=== Miscellany ===
- (1907) America: A Litany of Nations. Edited by George Sylvester Viereck. New York: The New Immigrants' Protective League.
- (1913) The Works of George Sylvester Viereck. New York: Moffat, Yard & Company [5 vols.]
- (1915) Debate between George Sylvester Viereck and Cecil Chesterton. New York: The Fatherland Corporation.
- (1925) The Harlot’s House and Other Poems. Edited, with an introduction, by George Sylvester Viereck. Girard, Kansas: Haldeman-Julius Company.
- (1929) As They Saw Us: Foch, Ludendorff and Other Leaders Write Our War History. Edited by George Sylvester Viereck. Garden City, N.Y.: Doubleday, Doran & Company.

=== Foreign editions ===
- (1906) Niniveh und Andere Gedichte, German translation of Niviveh and Other Poems. Stuttgart, Berlin: J.G. Cota.
- (1909) Das Haus des Vampyrs, German translation of The House of the Vampire. Der Kentaur Verlag.
- (2003) La Maison du Vampire, French translation of The House of the Vampire. La Clef d'Argent.
