= Centrifugal compressor =

Sub-class of turbomachinery

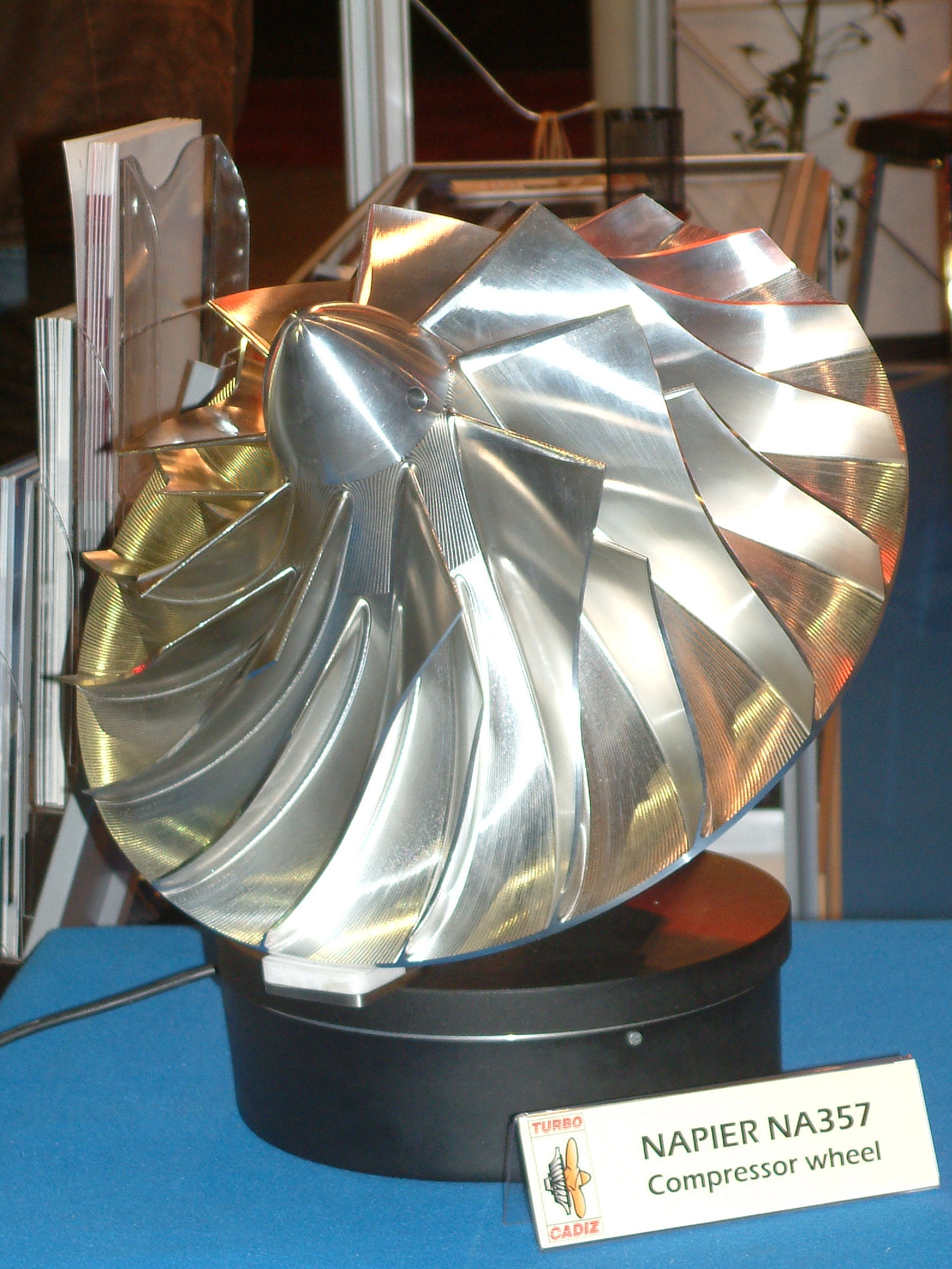
Centrifugal impeller, shown alone

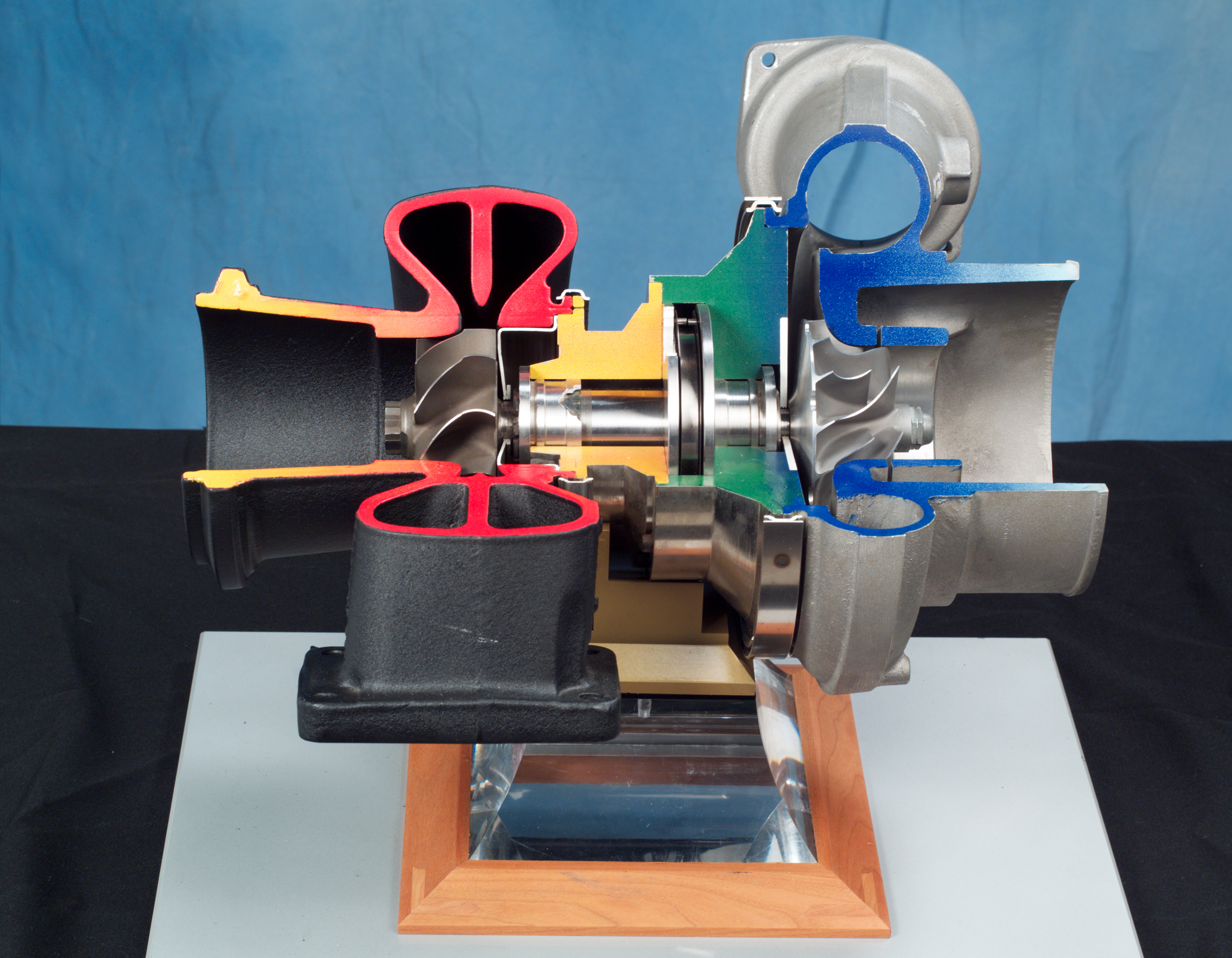
Centrifugal compressor shown (in blue) as part of a turbocharger

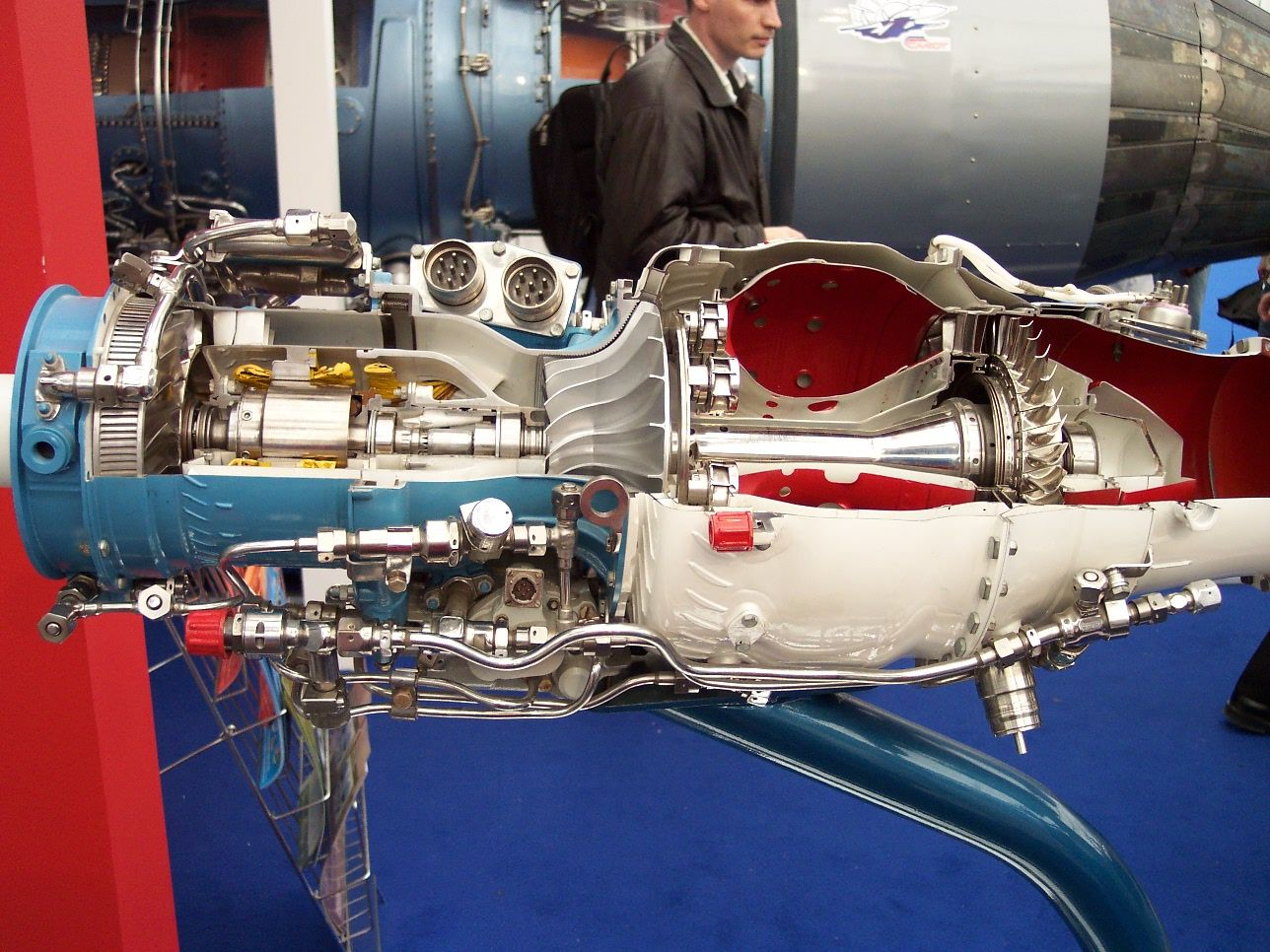
Centrifugal compressor shown (in blue) as second stage of an axi-centrifugal jet-engine

Centrifugal compressors, sometimes called impeller compressors or radial compressors, are a sub-class of dynamic, axisymmetric, work-absorbing turbomachinery.

They achieve pressure rise by adding energy to the continuous flow of fluid through the rotor/impeller. The equation in the next section shows this specific energy input. A substantial portion of this energy is kinetic, which is converted to increased potential energy/static pressure by slowing the flow through a diffuser. The static pressure rise in the impeller may roughly equal the rise in the diffuser.

== Components of a simple centrifugal compressor ==
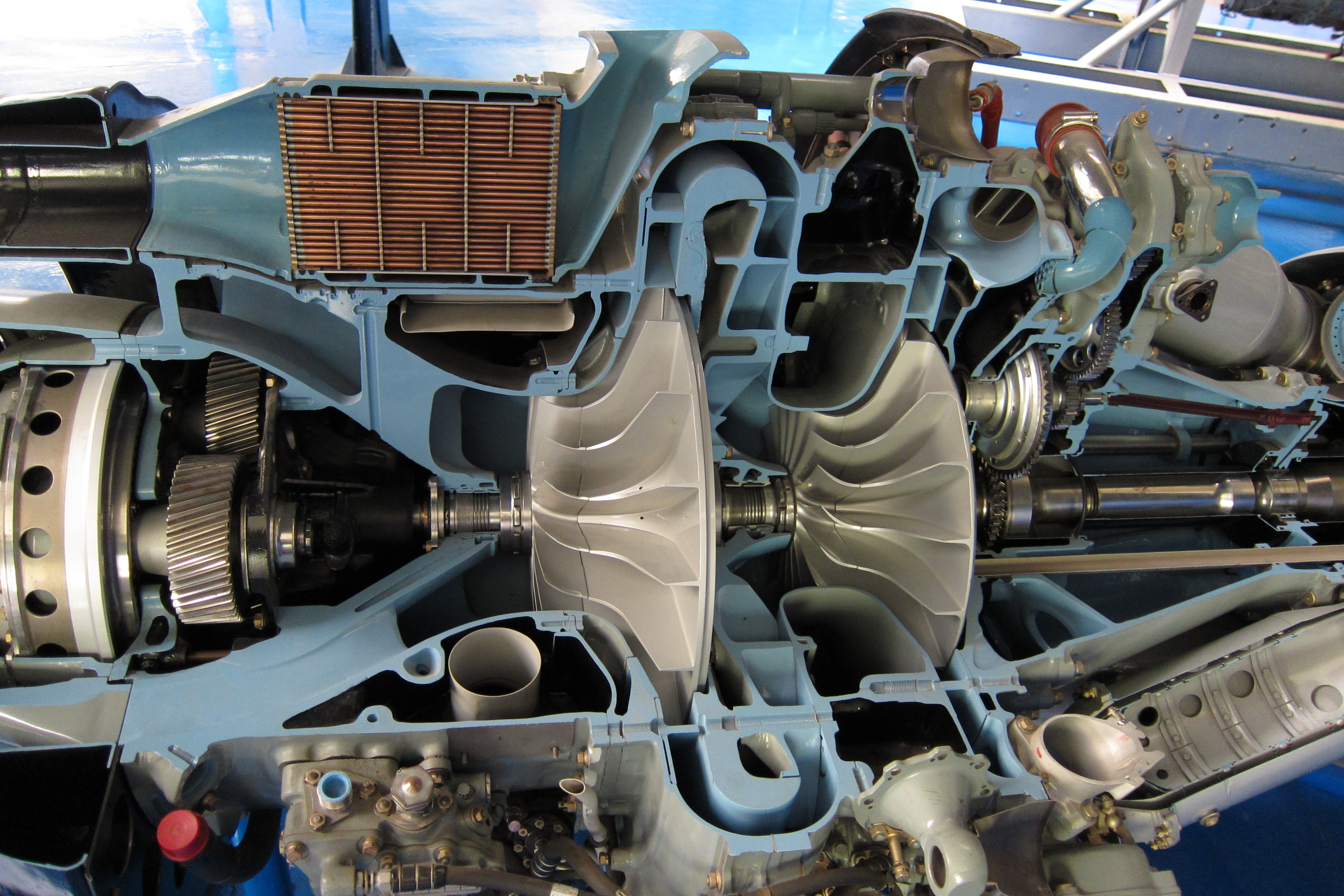
Figure 1.1 – Two-stage turboshaft, first-stage flowpath, annular inlet, guide vanes, open impeller, vaned diffuser, vaneless return bend

A simple centrifugal compressor stage has four components (listed in order of throughflow): inlet, impeller/rotor, diffuser, and collector. Figure 1.1 shows each of the components of the flow path, with the flow (working gas) entering the centrifugal impeller axially from left to right. This turboshaft (or turboprop) impeller is rotating counter-clockwise when looking downstream into the compressor. The flow will pass through the compressors from left to right.

=== Inlet ===
The simplest inlet to a centrifugal compressor is typically a simple pipe. Depending upon its use/application, inlets can be very complex. They may include other components such as an inlet throttle valve, a shrouded port, an annular duct (see Figure 1.1), a bifurcated duct, stationary guide vanes/airfoils used to straight or swirl flow (see Figure 1.1), movable guide vanes (used to vary pre-swirl adjustably). Compressor inlets often include instrumentation to measure pressure and temperature in order to control compressor performance.

Bernoulli's principle plays an important role in understanding vaneless stationary components like an inlet. In engineering situations assuming adiabatic flow, this equation can be written in the form:

$\frac{v_0^2}{2} + \frac{\gamma}{\gamma-1} \cdot \frac{p_0}{\rho} = \frac{v_1^2}{2} + \frac{\gamma}{\gamma-1} \cdot \frac{p_1}{\rho}$	1.1

where:

- Subscript 0 is the inlet of the compressor, station 0
- Subscript 1 is the inlet of the impeller, station 1
- p is the pressure
- ρ is the density and $\rho(\tilde{p})$ indicates that it is a function of pressure
- $v$ is the flow speed
- γ is the ratio of the specific heats of the fluid

=== Centrifugal impeller ===
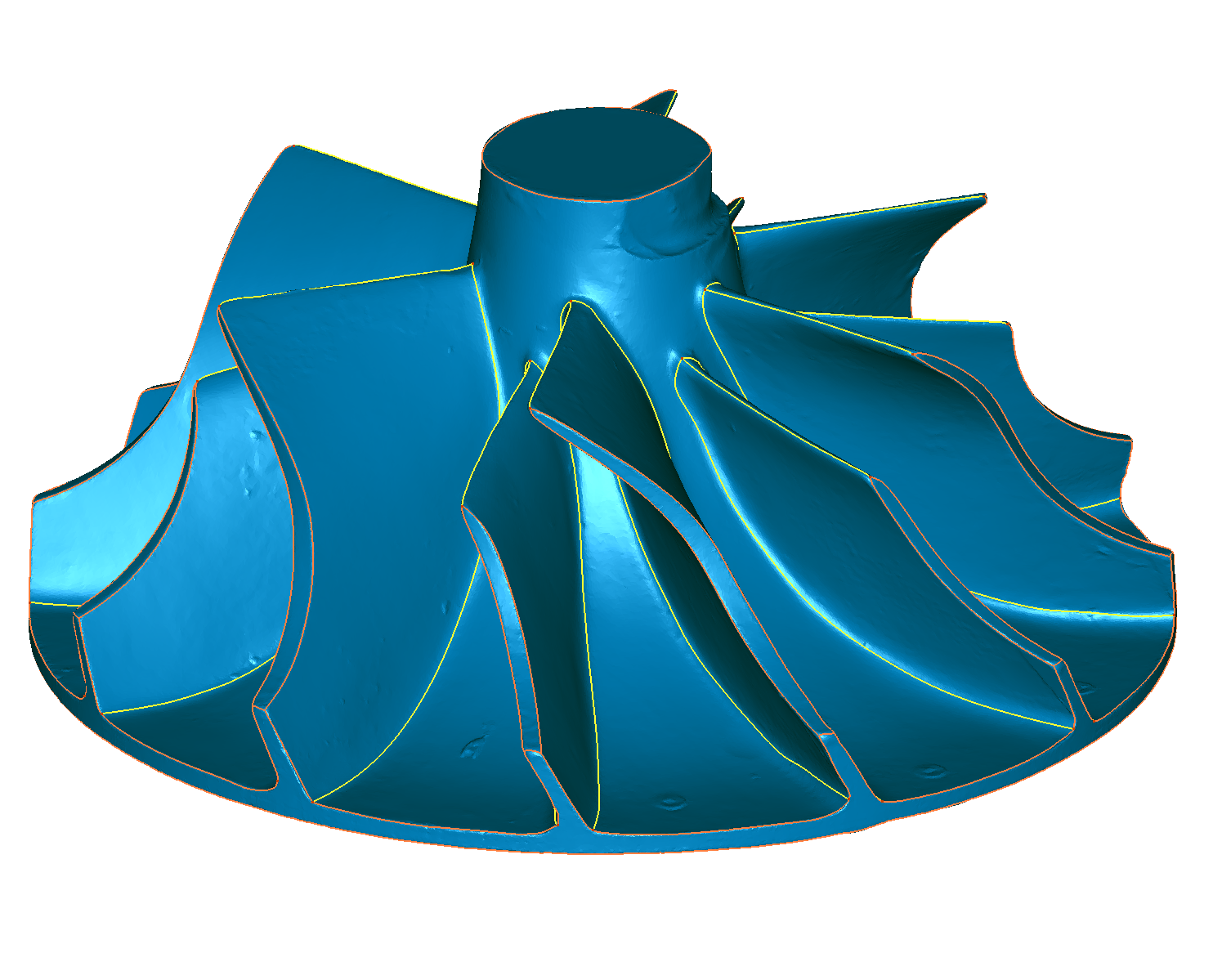
Figure 1.2.1 – Graphic modeling of the impeller, similar to turbocharger impeller

The identifying component of a centrifugal compressor stage is the centrifugal impeller rotor. Impellers are designed in many configurations including "open" (visible blades), "covered or shrouded", "with splitters" (every other inducer removed), and "without splitters" (all full blades). Figures 1.1, 1.2.1, and 1.3 show three different open, full-inducer rotors with alternating full blades/vanes and shorter-length splitter blades/vanes. Generally, the accepted mathematical nomenclature refers to the leading edge of the impeller with subscript 1. Correspondingly, the trailing edge of the impeller is referred to as subscript 2.

As the working-gas/flow passes through the impeller from stations 1 to 2, the kinetic and potential energy increase. This is identical to an axial compressor with the exception that the gases can reach higher energy levels through the impeller's increasing radius. In many modern high-efficiency centrifugal compressors, the gas exiting the impeller is traveling near the speed of sound.

Most modern high-efficiency impellers use "backsweep" in the blade shape.

Derived from the general Euler equations is Euler's pump and turbine equation, which plays an important role in understanding impeller performance. This equation can be written in the form:

$E=\left(\frac {u_2}{2g}-\frac {u_1}{2g}\right)+\left(\frac {w_2}{2g}-\frac {w_1}{2g}\right)+\left(\frac {c_2}{2g}-\frac {c_1}{2g}\right)$	1.2

- Subscript 1 is the impeller leading edge (inlet), station 1
- Subscript 2 is the impeller trailing edge (discharge), station 2
- E is the energy added to the fluid
- g is the acceleration due to gravity
- u is the impeller's circumferential velocity, units velocity
- w is the velocity of flow relative to the impeller, units velocity
- c is the absolute velocity of flow relative to stationary, units velocity
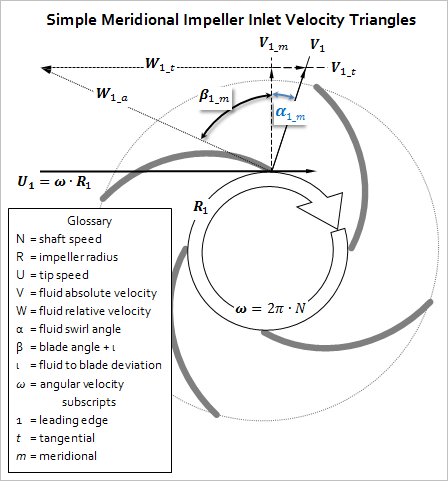
Figure 1.2.2 – Inlet velocity triangles for centrifugal compressor impeller

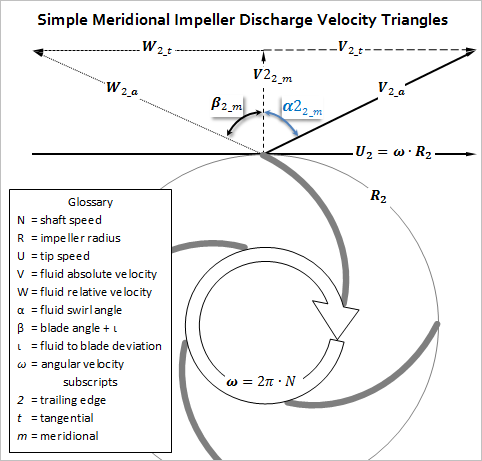
Figure 1.2.3 – Exit velocity triangles for centrifugal compressor impeller

=== Diffuser ===
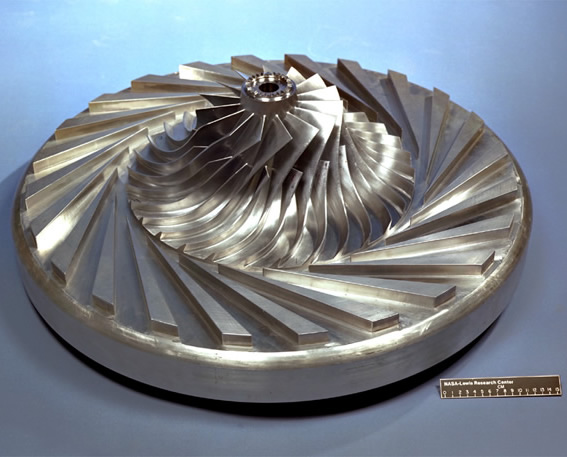
Figure 1.3 – NASA CC3 impeller and wedge diffuser

The next component downstream of the impeller within a simple centrifugal compressor may be the diffuser. The diffuser converts the flow's kinetic energy (high velocity) into increased potential energy (static pressure) by gradually slowing (diffusing) the gas velocity. Diffusers can be vaneless, vaned, or an alternating combination. High-efficiency vaned diffusers are also designed over a wide range of solidities from less than 1 to over 4. Hybrid versions of vaned diffusers include wedge (see Figure 1.3), channel, and pipe diffusers. Some turbochargers have no diffuser. Generally accepted nomenclature might refer to the diffuser's leading edge as station 3 and the trailing edge as station 4.

Bernoulli's principle plays an important role in understanding diffuser performance. In engineering situations assuming adiabatic flow, this equation can be written in the form:

$\frac{v_2^2}{2} + \frac{\gamma}{\gamma-1} \cdot \frac{p_2}{\rho} = \frac{v_4^2}{2} + \frac{\gamma}{\gamma-1} \cdot \frac{p_4}{\rho}$	1.3

where:

- Subscript 2 is the inlet of the diffuser, station 2
- Subscript 4 is the discharge of the diffuser, station 4
- (see inlet above.)

=== Collector ===
Figure 1.4 – Centrifugal compressor model illustrating the main components

The collector of a centrifugal compressor can take many shapes and forms. When the diffuser discharges into a large, empty, circumferentially constant-area chamber, the collector may be termed a Plenum. When the diffuser discharges into a device that looks somewhat like a snail shell, bull's horn, or a French horn, the collector is likely to be termed a volute or scroll.

When the diffuser discharges into an annular bend, the collector may be referred to as a combustor inlet (as used in jet engines or gas turbines) or a return channel (as used in an online multi-stage compressor). As the name implies, a collector's purpose is to gather the flow from the diffuser discharge annulus and deliver this flow downstream into whatever component the application requires. The collector or discharge pipe may also contain valves and instrumentation to control the compressor. In some applications, collectors will diffuse flow (converting kinetic energy to static pressure) far less efficiently than a diffuser.

Bernoulli's principle is important in understanding how diffusers perform. In engineering situations assuming adiabatic flow, this equation can be written in the form:

$\frac{v_4^2}{2} + \frac{\gamma}{\gamma-1} \cdot \frac{p_4}{\rho} = \frac{v_5^2}{2} + \frac{\gamma}{\gamma-1} \cdot \frac{p_5}{\rho}$	1.4

where:

- Subscript 4 is the inlet of the diffuser, station 4
- Subscript 5 is the discharge of the diffuser, station 5
- (see inlet above.)

== Historical contributions, the pioneers ==
Over the past 100 years, applied scientists including Stodola (1903, 1927–1945), Pfleiderer (1952), Hawthorne (1964), Shepherd (1956), Lakshminarayana (1996), and Japikse (many texts including citations), have educated young engineers in the fundamentals of turbomachinery. These understandings apply to all dynamic, continuous-flow, axisymmetric pumps, fans, blowers, and compressors in axial, mixed-flow, and radial/centrifugal configurations.

This relationship is the reason advances in turbines and axial compressors often find their way into other turbomachinery, including centrifugal compressors. Figures 2.1 and 2.2 illustrate the domain of turbomachinery with labels showing centrifugal compressors. Improvements in centrifugal compressors have not been achieved through large discoveries. Rather, improvements have been achieved through understanding and applying incremental pieces of knowledge discovered by many individuals.

=== Aerodynamic-thermodynamic domain ===
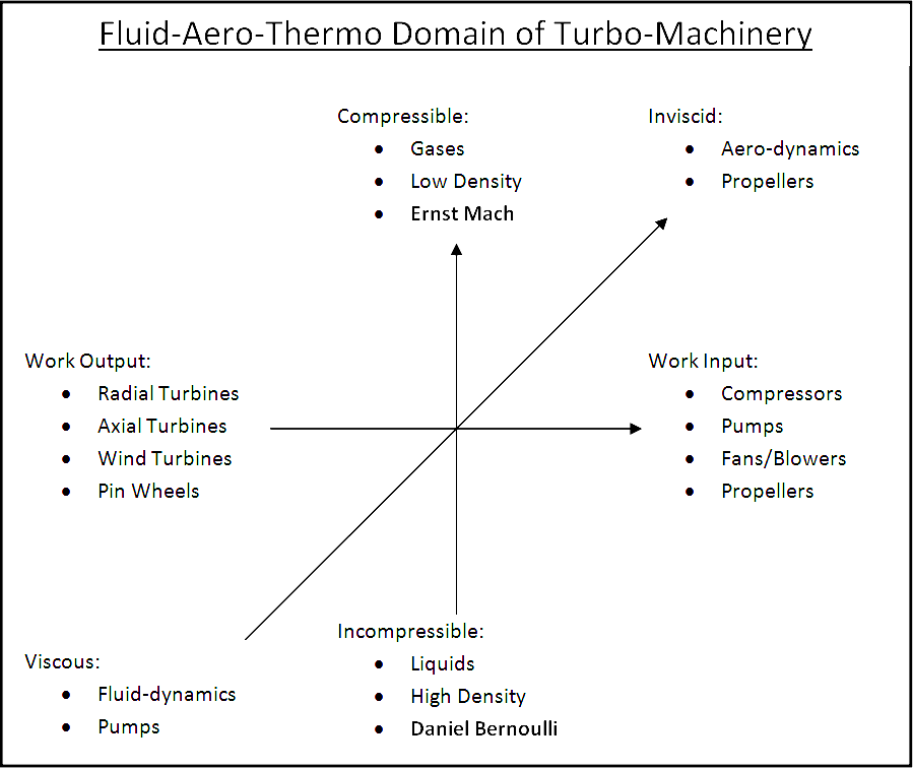
Figure 2.1 – Aero-thermo domain of turbomachinery

Figure 2.1 (shown right) represents the aero-thermo domain of turbomachinery. The horizontal axis represents the energy equation derivable from the first law of thermodynamics. The vertical axis, which can be characterized by Mach number, represents the range of fluid compressibility (or elasticity). The Z-axis, which can be characterized by Reynolds number, represents the range of fluid viscosities (or stickiness). Mathematicians and physicists who established the foundations of this aero-thermo domain include Isaac Newton, Daniel Bernoulli, Leonhard Euler, Claude-Louis Navier, George Stokes, Ernst Mach, Nikolay Yegorovich Zhukovsky, Martin Kutta, Ludwig Prandtl, Theodore von Kármán, Paul Richard Heinrich Blasius, and Henri Coandă.

=== Physical-mechanical domain ===
Figure 2.2 – Physical domain of turbomachinery

Figure 2.2 (shown right) represents the physical or mechanical domain of turbomachinery. Again, the horizontal axis represents the energy equation with turbines generating power to the left and compressors absorbing power to the right. Within the physical domain the vertical axis differentiates between high speeds and low speeds depending upon the turbomachinery application. The Z-axis differentiates between axial-flow geometry and radial-flow geometry within the physical domain of turbomachinery. It is implied that mixed-flow turbomachinery lie between axial and radial. Key contributors of technical achievements that pushed the practical application of turbomachinery forward include Denis Papin, Kernelien Le Demour, Daniel Gabriel Fahrenheit, John Smeaton, Dr. A. C. E. Rateau, John Barber, Alexander Sablukov, Sir Charles Algernon Parsons, Ægidius Elling, Sanford Alexander Moss, Willis Carrier, Adolf Busemann, Hermann Schlichting, Frank Whittle, and Hans von Ohain.

=== Partial timeline of historical contributions ===
Table 2.1
<1689	Early turbomachines	Pumps, blowers, fans
1689	Denis Papin	Origin of the centrifugal compressor
1754	Leonhard Euler	Euler's pump-and-turbine equation
1791	John Barber	First gas-turbine patent
1899	A. C. E. Rateau	First practical centrifugal compressor
1927	Aurel Boleslav Stodola	Formalized "slip factor"
1928	Adolf Busemann	Derived "slip factor"
1937	Frank Whittle and Hans von Ohain, independently	First gas turbine using a centrifugal compressor
>1970	Modern turbomachines	3D-CFD, rocket turbo-pumps, heart assist pumps, turbocharged fuel cells

== Turbomachinery similarities ==
Centrifugal compressors are similar in many ways to other turbomachinery and are compared and contrasted as follows:

=== Similarities to axial compressor ===
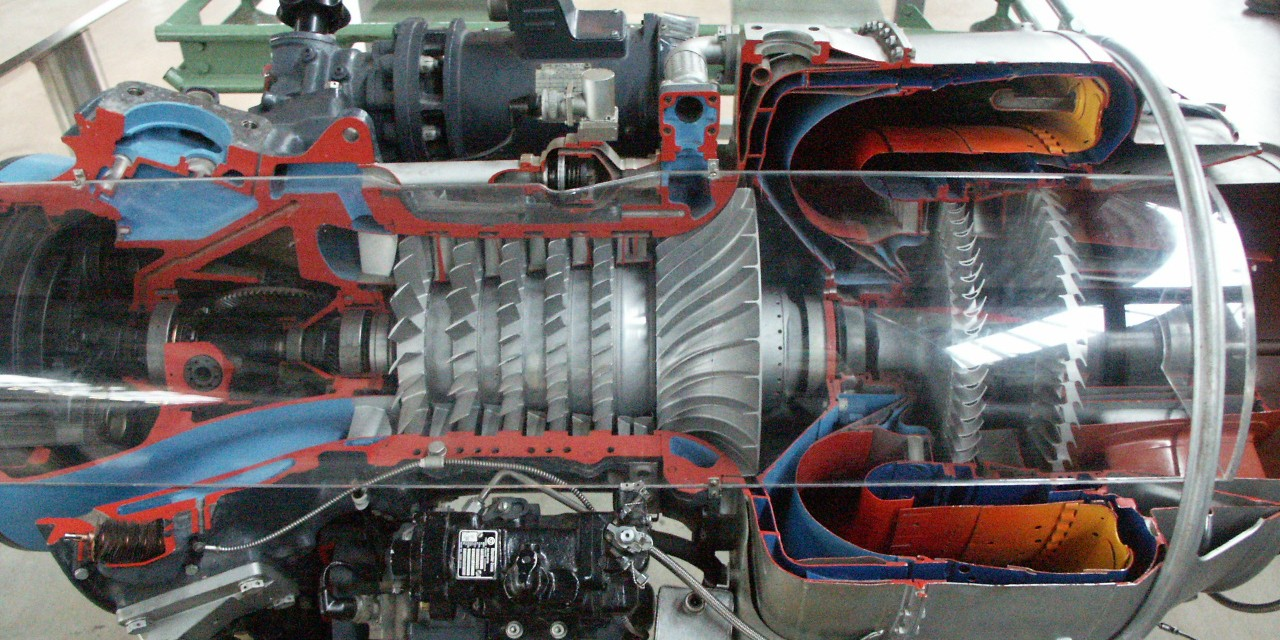
Cutaway showing an axi-centrifugal compressor gas turbine

Centrifugal compressors are similar to axial compressors in that they are rotating airfoil-based compressors. Both are shown in the adjacent photograph of an engine with 5 stages of axial compressors and one stage of a centrifugal compressor. The first part of the centrifugal impeller looks very similar to an axial compressor. This first part of the centrifugal impeller is also termed an inducer. Centrifugal compressors differ from axials as they use a significant change in radius from inlet to exit of the impeller to produce a much greater pressure rise in a single stage (e.g. 8 in the Pratt & Whitney Canada PW200 series of helicopter engines) than does an axial stage. The 1940s-era German Heinkel HeS 011 experimental engine was the first aviation turbojet to have a compressor stage with radial flow-turning part-way between none for an axial and 90 degrees for a centrifugal. It is known as a mixed/diagonal-flow compressor. A diagonal stage is used in the Pratt & Whitney Canada PW600 series of small turbofans.

=== Centrifugal fan ===
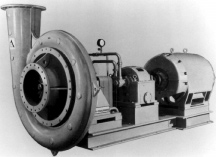
A low-speed, low-pressure centrifugal compressor or centrifugal fan, with upward discharging cone used to diffuse the air velocity

Centrifugal compressors are also similar to centrifugal fans of the style shown in the neighboring figure, as they both increase the energy of the flow through the increasing radius. In contrast to centrifugal fans, compressors operate at higher speeds to generate greater pressure rises. In many cases, the engineering methods used to design a centrifugal fan are the same as those to design a centrifugal compressor, so they can look very similar.

For purposes of generalization and definition, it can be said that centrifugal compressors often have density increases greater than 5 percent. Also, they often experience relative fluid velocities above Mach number 0.3 when the working fluid is air or nitrogen. In contrast, fans or blowers are often considered to have density increases of less than five percent and peak relative fluid velocities below Mach 0.3.

=== Squirrel-cage fan ===
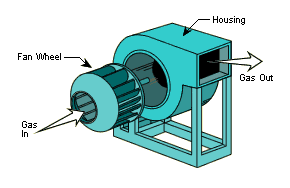
A low-speed, low-pressure blower used for HVAC ventilation

Squirrel-cage fans are primarily used for ventilation. The flow field within this type of fan has internal recirculations. In comparison, a centrifugal fan is uniform circumferentially.

=== Centrifugal pump ===
A 3D-solids model of a type of centrifugal pump

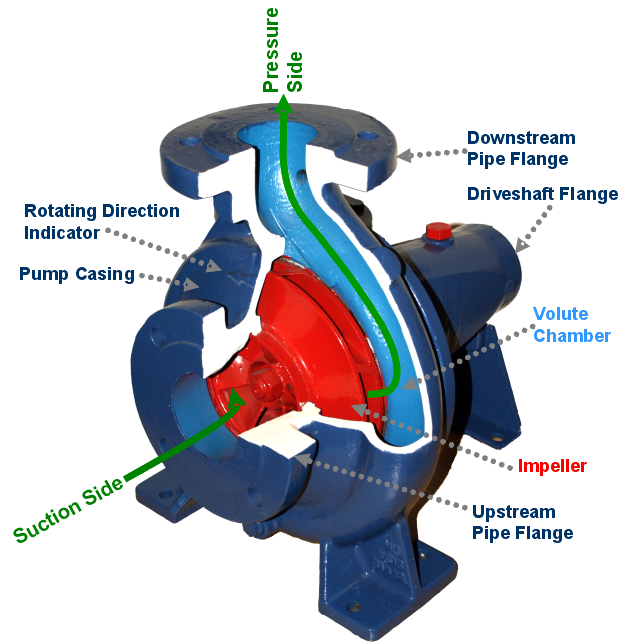
Cut-away of a centrifugal pump

Centrifugal compressors are also similar to centrifugal pumps of the style shown in the adjacent figures. The key difference between such compressors and pumps is that the compressor working fluid is a gas (compressible) and the pump working fluid is liquid (incompressible). Again, the engineering methods used to design a centrifugal pump are the same as those to design a centrifugal compressor. Yet, there is one important difference: the need to deal with cavitation in pumps.

Although centrifugal compressors and centrifugal pumps share similar mechanical layouts, their design objectives differ due to the compressibility of the working fluid. In centrifugal compressors, changes in gas density and temperature during compression significantly influence impeller design, diffuser geometry, and overall stage performance. In contrast, centrifugal pumps primarily operate with incompressible liquids, allowing density to be treated as constant during operation. As a result, compressors require additional considerations such as surge control, choke limits, and thermal effects, which are generally not critical in pump design.

In centrifugal compressors, energy is transferred to the gas primarily through the rotating impeller, increasing both velocity and pressure. The high-velocity gas then passes through a diffuser, where a portion of the kinetic energy is converted into static pressure. This process is similar in principle to centrifugal pumps, although the effects of compressibility are significant only in compressors.

Because gases are compressible, centrifugal compressors experience changes in density throughout the flow path, which affects pressure rise and efficiency. Pump operation, using incompressible liquids, does not involve such density variations, simplifying performance prediction and control.

=== Radial turbine ===
Centrifugal compressors also look very similar to their turbomachinery counterpart, the radial turbine, as shown in the figure. While a compressor transfers energy into a flow to raise its pressure, a turbine operates in reverse, by extracting energy from a flow, thus reducing its pressure. In other words, power is input to compressors and output from turbines.

== Turbomachinery using centrifugal compressors ==
=== Standards ===
As turbomachinery has become more common, standards have been created to guide manufacturers to assure end-users that their products meet minimum safety and performance requirements. Associations formed to codify these standards rely on manufacturers, end-users, and related technical specialists. A partial list of these associations and their standards are listed below:

- American Society of Mechanical Engineers: BPVC, PTC.
- American Petroleum Institute: API STD 617 8TH ED (E1), API STD 672 5TH ED (2019).
- American Society of Heating, Refrigeration, and Airconditioning Engineers: Handbook Fundamentals.
- Society of Automotive Engineers
- Compressed Air and Gas Institute
- International Organization for Standardization: ISO 10439, ISO 10442, ISO 18740, ISO 6368, ISO 5389

=== Applications ===
Below is a partial list of centrifugal-compressor applications, each with a brief description of some of the general characteristics possessed by those compressors. To start this list, two of the most well-known centrifugal compressor applications are listed: gas turbines and turbochargers.

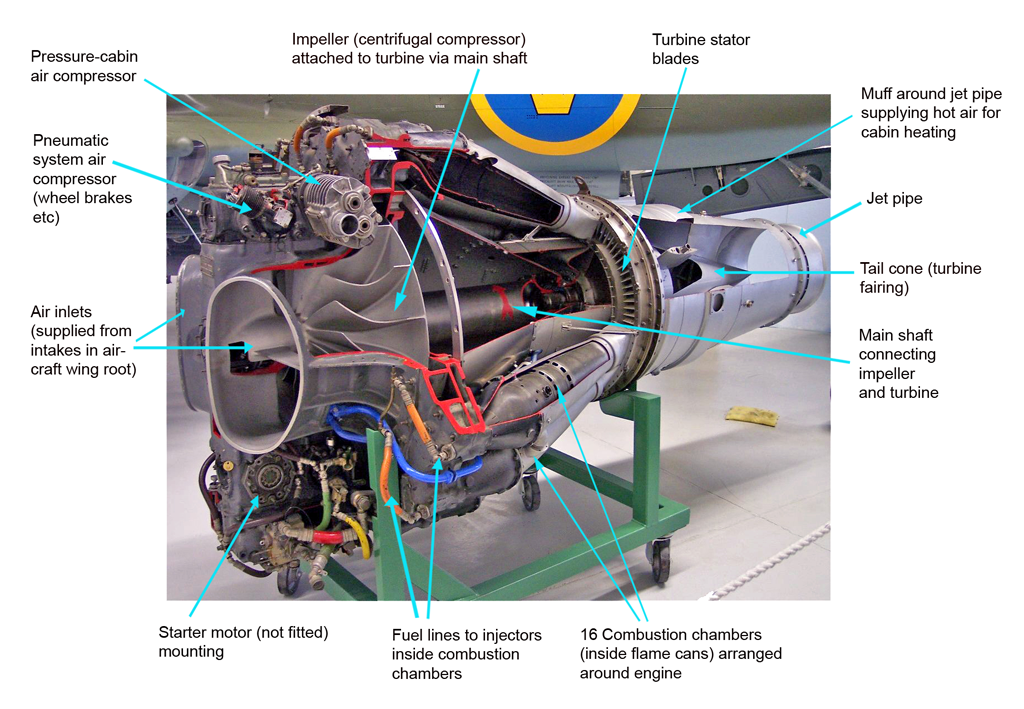
Figure 4.1 – Jet engine cutaway showing the centrifugal compressor and other parts

Figure 4.2 – Jet engine cross section showing the centrifugal compressor and other parts

- In gas turbines and auxiliary power units. Ref. Figures 4.1–4.2
  In their simple form, modern gas turbines operate on the Brayton cycle. (ref Figure 5.1) Either or both axial and centrifugal compressors are used to provide compression. The types of gas turbines that most often include centrifugal compressors include small aircraft engines (i.e. turboshafts, turboprops, and turbofans), auxiliary power units, and micro-turbines. The industry standards applied to all centrifugal compressors used in aircraft applications are set by the relevant civilian and military certification authorities to achieve the safety and durability required in service. Centrifugal impellers used in gas turbines are commonly made from titanium alloy forgings. Their flow-path blades are commonly flank-milled or point-milled on 5-axis milling machines. When running clearances have to be as small as possible without the impeller rubbing its shroud, the impeller is first drawn with its high-temperature, high-speed deflected shape and then drawn in its equivalent cold, static shape for manufacturing. This is necessary because the impeller deflections at the most severe running condition can be 100 times larger than the required hot running clearance between the impeller and its shroud.

- In automotive engine and diesel engine turbochargers and superchargers. Ref. Figure 1.1
  Centrifugal compressors used in conjunction with reciprocating internal combustion engines are known as turbochargers if driven by the engine's exhaust gas and turbo-superchargers if mechanically driven by the engine. Standards set by the industry for turbochargers may have been established by SAE. Ideal-gas properties often work well for the design, test, and analysis of turbocharger centrifugal-compressor performance.

- In pipeline compressors of natural gas to move the gas from the production site to the consumer.
  Centrifugal compressors for such uses may be one- or multi-stage and driven by large gas turbines. Standards set by the industry (ANSI/API, ASME) result in thick casings to achieve a required level of safety. The impellers are often, if not always, of the covered style, which makes them look much like pump impellers. This type of compressor is also often termed an API-style. The power needed to drive these compressors is most often in the thousands of horsepower. The use of real-gas properties is needed to properly design, test, and analyze the performance of gas-pipeline centrifugal compressors.

- In oil refineries, natural-gas processing, petrochemical and chemical plants.
  Centrifugal compressors for such uses are often one-shaft, multi-stage, and driven by large steam or gas turbines. Their casings are termed horizontally split if the rotor is lowered into the bottom half during assembly or barrel if it has no lengthwise split-line with the rotor being slid in. Standards set by the industry (ANSI/API, ASME) for these compressors result in thick casings to achieve a required level of safety. The impellers are often of the covered style, which makes them look much like pump impellers. This type of compressor is also often termed API-style. The power needed to drive these compressors is usually in the thousands of horsepower. Use of real-gas properties is needed to properly design, test and analyze their performance.

- Air-conditioning and refrigeration and HVAC: Centrifugal compressors often supply the compression in water-chiller cycles.
  Because of the wide variety of vapor compression cycles (thermodynamic cycle, thermodynamics) and the wide variety of working fluids (refrigerants), centrifugal compressors are used in a variety of sizes and configurations. Use of real-gas properties is needed to properly design, test, and analyze the performance of these machines. Standards set by the industry for these compressors include ASHRAE, ASME, & API.

- In industry and manufacturing to supply compressed air for all types of pneumatic tools.
  Centrifugal compressors for such uses are often multistage and driven by electric motors. Inter-cooling is often needed between stages to control air temperature. Road-repair crews and automobile-repair garages find screw compressors better adapted to their needs. Standards set by the industry for these compressors include ASME and government regulations that emphasize safety. Ideal-gas relationships are often used to properly design, test, and analyze the performance of these machines. Carrier's equation is often used to deal with humidity.

- In air-separation plants to manufacture purified end-product gases.
  Centrifugal compressors for such uses are often multistage, using inter-cooling to control air temperature. Standards set by the industry for these compressors include ASME and government regulations that emphasize safety. Ideal-gas relationships are often used to properly design, test, and analyze the performance of these machines when the working gas is air or nitrogen. Other gases require real-gas properties.

- In oil field re-injection of high-pressure natural gas to improve oil recovery.
  Centrifugal compressors for such uses are often one-shaft, multi-stage, and driven by gas turbines. With discharge pressures approaching 700 bar, casings are of the barrel style. Standards set by the industry (API, ASME) for these compressors result in large, thick casings to maximize safety. The impellers are often if not always of the covered style, which makes them look much like pump impellers. This type of compressor is also often termed API-style. The use of real-gas properties is needed to properly design, test, and analyze their performance.

== Theory of operation ==
In the case where flow passes through a straight pipe to enter a centrifugal compressor, the flow is axial, uniform, and has no vorticity, i.e. swirling motion. As the flow passes through the centrifugal impeller, the impeller forces the flow to spin faster as it gets further from the rotational axis. According to Euler's pump and turbine equation, the energy input to the fluid is proportional to the flow's local spinning velocity multiplied by the local impeller tangential velocity.

In many cases, the flow leaving the centrifugal impeller is traveling near the speed of sound. It then flows through a stationary compressor causing it to decelerate. The stationary compressor is ducting with increasing flow-area where energy transformation takes place. If the flow has to be turned in a rearward direction to enter the next part of the machine, e.g. another impeller or a combustor, then flow losses can be reduced by directing the flow with stationary turning vanes or individual turning pipes (pipe diffusers). In accordance with Bernoulli's principle, the reduction in velocity causes the pressure to rise.

== Performance ==
Figure 5.1 – Illustration of the Brayton cycle as applied to a gas turbine

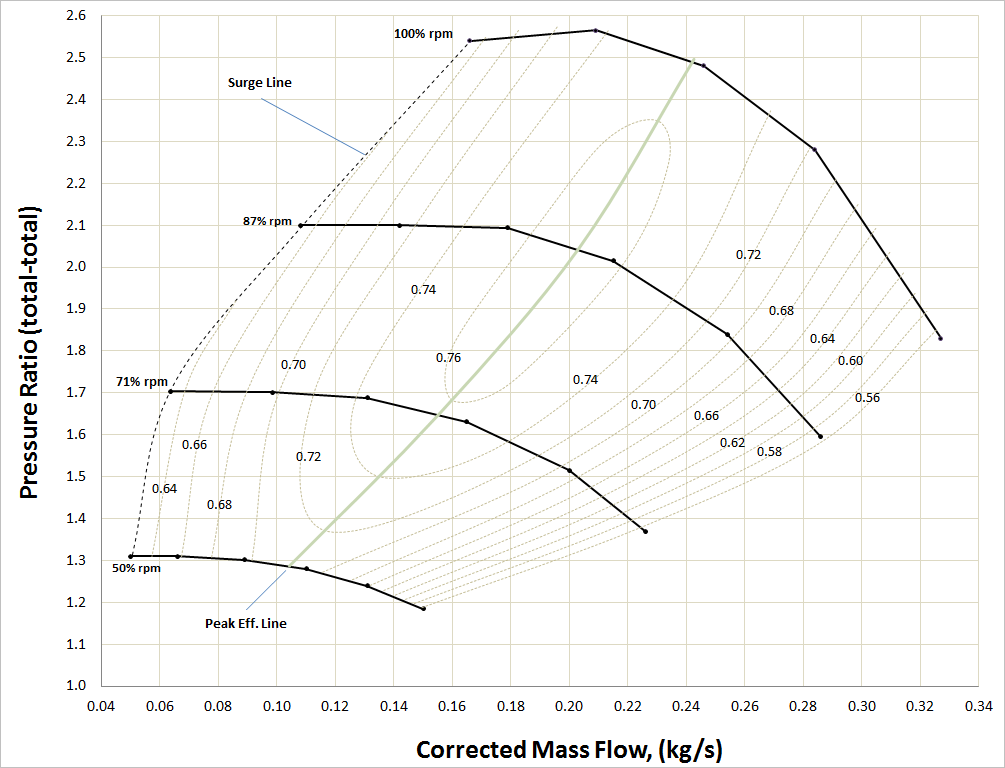
Figure 5.2 – Example centrifugal compressor performance map

While illustrating a gas turbine's Brayton cycle, Figure 5.1 includes example plots of pressure-specific volume and temperature-entropy. These types of plots are fundamental to understanding centrifugal compressor performance at one operating point. The two plots show that the pressure rises between the compressor inlet (station 1) and compressor exit (station 2). At the same time, the specific volume decreases while the density increases. The temperature-entropy plot shows that the temperature increases with increasing entropy (loss). Assuming dry air, and the ideal-gas equation of state and an isentropic process, there is enough information to define the pressure ratio and efficiency for this one point. The compressor map is required to understand the compressor performance over its complete operating range.

Figure 5.2, a centrifugal-compressor performance map (either test or estimated), shows the flow, pressure ratio for each of 4 speed-lines (total of 23 data points). Also included are constant-efficiency contours. Centrifugal-compressor performance presented in this form provides enough information to match the hardware represented by the map to a simple set of end-user requirements.

Compared to estimating performance, which is very cost effective (thus useful in design), testing, while costly, is still the most precise method. Further, testing centrifugal compressor performance is very complex. Professional societies such as ASME (i.e. PTC–10, Fluid Meters Handbook, PTC-19.x), ASHRAE (ASHRAE Handbook) and API (ANSI/API 617–2002, 672–2007) have established standards for detailed experimental methods and analysis of test results. Despite this complexity, a few basic concepts in performance can be presented by examining an example test performance map.

=== Performance maps ===
Pressure ratio and flow are the main parameters needed to match the Figure 5.2 performance map to a simple compressor application. In this case, it can be assumed that the inlet temperature is sea-level standard. This assumption is not acceptable in practice, as inlet temperature variations cause significant variations in compressor performance. Figure 5.2 shows:

- Corrected mass flow: 0.04–0.34 kg/s
- Total pressure ratio, inlet to discharge (PR_{t-t} = P_{t,discharge}/P_{t,inlet}): 1.0–2.6

As is standard practice, Figure 5.2 has a horizontal axis labeled with a flow parameter. While flow measurements use a variety of units, all fit one of 2 categories: mass flow per unit time or volume flow per unit time.

==== Mass flow per unit time ====
Mass flow units, such as kg/s, are the easiest to use in practice, as there is little room for confusion. Questions remaining would involve inlet or outlet (which might involve leakage from the compressor or moisture condensation). For atmospheric air, the mass flow may be wet or dry (including or excluding humidity). Often, the mass-flow specification will be presented on an equivalent Mach-number basis, $m\sqrt{\theta}/{\delta}$. It is standard in these cases that the equivalent temperature, equivalent pressure, and gas is specified explicitly or implied at a standard condition.

==== Volume flow per unit time ====
In contrast, all volume-flow specifications require the additional specification of density. Bernoulli's principle is of great value in understanding this problem. Confusion arises through either inaccuracies or misuse of pressure, temperature, and gas constants.

Also as is standard practice, Figure 5.2 has a vertical axis labeled with a pressure parameter. There is a variety of pressure measurement units. They all fit one of two categories:

- A change in pressure, ie increase from inlet to exit (measured with a manometer)
- A discharge pressure

The pressure rise may alternatively be specified as a ratio that has no units:

- A pressure ratio (exit/inlet)

Other features common to performance maps are constant-speed lines, constant-efficiency islands, and design or guarantee points.

==== Constant-speed lines ====
The two most common methods for producing a map for a centrifugal compressor are at constant shaft speed or with a constant throttle setting. If the speed is held constant, then test points are taken along a constant-speed line by changing throttle positions. In contrast, if a throttle valve is held constant, then test points are established by changing speed and repeated with different throttle positions (common gas turbine practice). The map shown in Figure 5.2 illustrates the most common method; lines of constant speed. In this case, we see data points connected via straight lines at speeds of 50%, 71%, 87%, and 100% RPM. The first three speed-lines have 6 points each, while the highest speed line has five.

==== Constant-efficiency islands ====
The next feature to be discussed is the oval-shaped curves representing islands of constant efficiency. In this figure, we see 11 contours ranging from 56% efficiency (decimal 0.56) to 76% efficiency (decimal 0.76). General standard practice is to interpret these efficiencies as isentropic rather than polytropic. The inclusion of efficiency islands effectively generates a 3-dimensional topology for this 2-dimensional map. With inlet density specified, it provides a further ability to calculate aerodynamic power. Lines of constant power could just as easily be substituted.

==== Design or guarantee points ====
Regarding gas turbine operation and performance, there may be a series of guaranteed points established for the gas turbine's centrifugal compressor. These requirements are of secondary importance to the overall gas turbine performance as a whole. For this reason, it is only necessary to summarize that in the ideal case, the lowest specific fuel consumption would occur when the centrifugal compressor's peak efficiency curve coincides with the gas turbine's required operation line.

In contrast to gas turbines, most other applications (including industrial) need to meet a less stringent set of performance requirements. Historically, centrifugal compressors applied to industrial applications were needed to achieve performance at a specific flow and pressure. Modern industrial compressors are often needed to achieve specific performance goals across a range of flows and pressures, thus taking a significant step toward the sophistication seen in gas turbine applications.

If the compressor represented in Figure 5.2 is used in a simple application, then any point (pressure and flow) within the 76% efficiency would provide very acceptable performance. An end user would be very happy with the performance requirements of 2.0 pressure ratio at 0.21 kg/s.

=== Surge ===
Surge is a low-flow phenomenon where the impeller cannot add enough energy to overcome the system resistance or backpressure. At low-flow-rate operation, the pressure ratio over the impeller is high, as is backpressure. Under critical conditions, the flow will reverse back over the tips of the rotor blades towards the impeller eye (inlet). This stalling flow reversal may go unnoticed if the fraction of mass flow or energy is too low. When large enough, rapid flow reversal occurs (i.e., surge). The reversed flow exiting the impeller inlet exhibits a strong rotational component, which affects lower-radius flow angles (closer to the impeller hub) at the leading edge of the blades. The deterioration of the flow angles causes the impeller to be inefficient. A full flow reversal can occur. (Therefore, surge is sometimes referred to as axisymmetric stall.) When reversed flow reduces to a low-enough level, the impeller recovers and regains stability for a short moment, at which point the stage may surge again. These cyclic events cause large vibrations, increase temperature, and change rapidly the axial thrust. These occurrences can damage the rotor seals, rotor bearings, the compressor driver, and cycle operation. Most turbomachines are designed to easily withstand occasional surging. However, if the machine is forced to surge repeatedly for a long period of time, or if it is poorly designed, then repeated surges can result in a catastrophic failure. Of particular interest is that while turbomachines may be very durable, their physical system can be far less robust.

==== Surge line ====
Figure 6.2.1: Stall formation

The surge-line shown in Figure 5.2 is the curve that passes through the lowest flow points of each of the four speed-lines. As a test map, these points would be the lowest flow points possible to record a stable reading within the test facility/rig. In many industrial applications, it may be necessary to increase the stall line due to the system backpressure. For example, at 100% RPM stalling flow might increase from approximately 0.170 kg/s to 0.215 kg/s because of the positive slope of the pressure ratio curve.

As stated earlier, the reason for this is that the high-speed line in Figure 5.2 exhibits a stalling characteristic or positive slope within that range of flows. When placed in a different system, those lower flows might not be achievable because of interaction with that system. System resistance or adverse pressure is proven mathematically to be the critical contributor to compressor surge.

=== Maximum flow line versus choke ===
Choke occurs under one of two conditions. Typically for high-speed equipment, as flow increases, the velocity of the flow can approach sonic speed somewhere within the compressor stage. This location may occur at the impeller inlet "throat" or at the vaned diffuser inlet "throat". In contrast, for lower-speed equipment, as flows increase, losses increase such that the pressure ratio eventually drops to 1:1. In this case, the occurrence of choke is unlikely.

The speed-lines of gas-turbine centrifugal compressors typically exhibit choke. This is a situation where the pressure ratio of a speed line drops rapidly (vertically) with little or no change in flow. In most cases the reason for this is that close-to-Mach-1 velocities have been reached somewhere within the impeller or diffuser, generating a rapid increase in losses. Higher-pressure-ratio turbocharger centrifugal compressors exhibit this same phenomenon. Real choke phenomena are a function of compressibility as measured by the local Mach number within an area restriction within the centrifugal pressure stage.

The maximum flow line, shown in Figure 5.2, is the curve that passes through the highest-flow points of each speed line. Upon inspection, it may be noticed that each of these points has been taken near 56% efficiency. Selecting a low efficiency (<60%) is the most common practice used to terminate compressor performance maps at high flows. Another factor that is used to establish the maximum flow line is a pressure ratio near or equal to 1. The 50% speed line may be considered an example of this.

The shape of Figure 5.2's speed-lines provides a good example of why it is inappropriate to use the term choke in association with a maximum flow of all centrifugal compressor speed-lines. In summary, most industrial and commercial centrifugal compressors are selected or designed to operate at or near their highest efficiencies and to avoid operation at low efficiencies. For this reason, there is seldom a reason to illustrate centrifugal compressor performance below 60% efficiency.

Many industrial and commercial multistage compressor performance maps exhibits this same vertical characteristic for a different reason related to what is known as stage stacking.

=== Other operating limits ===
Minimum operating speed
The minimum speed for acceptable operation; below this value, the compressor may be controlled to stop or go into an idle condition.
Maximum allowable speed
The maximum operating speed for the compressor. Beyond this value, stresses may rise above prescribed limits, and rotor vibrations may increase rapidly. At speeds above this level, the equipment will likely become very dangerous and be controlled to lower speeds.

== Dimensional analysis ==
To weigh the advantages between centrifugal compressors, it is important to compare 8 parameters classic to turbomachinery: pressure rise (p), flow (Q), angular speed (N), power (P), density (ρ), diameter (D), viscosity (μ), and elasticity (e). This creates a practical problem when trying to experimentally determine the effect of any one parameter. This is because it is nearly impossible to change one of these parameters independently.

The Buckingham π theorem can help solve this problem by generating 5 dimensionless forms of these parameters. These parameters provide the foundation for "similitude" and the "affinity laws" in turbomachinery. They provide for the creation of additional relationships (being dimensionless) found valuable in the characterization of performance.

For the example below, head will be substituted for pressure, and sonic velocity will be substituted for elasticity.

=== Buckingham Π theorem ===
The three independent dimensions used in this procedure for turbomachinery are:

- $M$ mass (force is an alternative)
- $L$ length
- $T$ time

According to the theorem, each of the eight main parameters are equated to its independent dimensions as follows:

Flow	$Q =$	$\frac{L^3}{T}$	ex. = m^{3}/s
Head	$H =$	$\frac{M L}{T^2}$	ex. = kg·m/s^{2}
Speed	$U =$	$\frac{L}{T}$	ex. = m/s
Power	$P =$	$\frac{M L^2}{T^3}$	ex. = kg·m^{2}/s^{3}
Density	$\rho =$	$\frac{M}{L^3}$	ex. = kg/m^{3}
Viscosity	$\mu =$	$\frac{M}{L T}$	ex. = kg/m·s
Diameter	$D =$	$L$	ex. = m
Speed of sound	$a =$	$\frac{L}{T}$	ex. = m/s

=== Classic turbomachinery similitude ===
Completing the task of following the formal procedure results in generating this classic set of five dimensionless parameters for turbomachinery. Full similitude is achieved when each one of the 5 Pi-parameters is equivalent when comparing two different cases. This would mean the two turbomachines being compared are similar, both geometrically and in terms of performance.

Table of Classic dimension-less similitude parameters
1	Flow coefficient	$\Pi_1 =$	$\frac{Q}{N D^3}$
2	Head coefficient	$\Pi_2 =$	$\frac{g H}{N^2 D^2}$
3	Speed coefficient	$\Pi_4 =$	$\frac{N D}{a}$
4	Power coefficient	$\Pi_3 =$	$\frac{P}{\rho N^3 D^5}$
5	Reynolds coefficient	$\Pi_5 =$	$\frac{\rho N D^2}{\mu}$

Turbomachinery analysts gain insight into performance by comparisons of the 5 parameters shown in the above table, especially parameters such as efficiencies and loss coefficients, which are also dimensionless. In general applications, the flow coefficient and head coefficient are considered of primary importance. Generally, for centrifugal compressors, the speed coefficient is of secondary importance while the Reynolds coefficient is of tertiary importance. In contrast, as expected for pumps, the Reynolds coefficient becomes of secondary importance, and the speed coefficient of tertiary importance. It may be found interesting that the speed coefficient may be chosen to define the y-axis of Figure 1.1, while at the same time the Reynolds coefficient may be chosen to define the z-axis.

=== Other dimensionless combinations ===
Demonstrated in the table below is another value of dimensional analysis. Any number of new dimensionless parameters can be calculated through exponents and multiplication. For example, a variation of the first parameter shown below is popularly used in aircraft-engine system analysis. The third parameter is a simplified dimensional variation of the first and second. This third definition is applicable with strict limitations. The fourth parameter, specific speed, is very well-known and useful in that it removes diameter. The fifth parameter, specific diameter, is a less-often-discussed dimensionless parameter found useful by Balje.

1	Corrected mass flow coefficient	$\Pi_1 \Pi_4 =$	$\frac{m}{p D^2} \left(\frac{Rt}{k}\right)^{0.5}$
2	Alternate#1 equivalent Mach form	$\frac{m_1}{\rho_1 a_1 {D_1}^2 \cos(\alpha_1)} =$	$\frac{m_2}{\rho_2 a_2 {D_2}^2 \cos(\alpha_2)}$
3	Alternate#2 simplified dimensional form	$\frac{m_1 {t_1}^{0.5}}{p_1} =$	$\frac{m_2 {t_2}^{0.5}}{p_2}$
4	Specific speed coefficient	$\frac{{\Pi_1}^{0.5}}{{\Pi_2}^{0.75}} =$	$\frac{N Q^{0.5}}{(g H)^{0.75}}$
5	Specific diameter coefficient	$\frac{{\Pi_2}^{0.25}}{{\Pi_1}^{0.5}} =$	$\frac{D (g H)^{0.25}}{Q^{0.5}}$

It may be found interesting that the specific speed coefficient may be used in place of speed to define the y-axis of Figure 1.2, while at the same time, the specific diameter coefficient may be in place of diameter to define the z-axis.

=== Affinity laws ===
The following affinity laws are derived from the five Π-parameters shown above. They provide a simple basis for scaling turbomachinery from one application to the next.

From flow coefficient	$\frac{Q_1}{Q_2} =$	$\frac{N_1}{N_2} =$	$\left(\frac{D_1}{D_2}\right)^3$
From head coefficient	$\frac{H_1}{H_2} =$	$\left(\frac{N_1}{N_2}\right)^2 =$	$\left(\frac{D_1}{D_2}\right)^2$
From power coefficient	$\frac{P_1}{P_2} =$	$\left(\frac{N_1}{N_2}\right)^3 =$	$\left(\frac{D_1}{D_2}\right)^5$

== Aero-thermodynamic fundamentals ==
The following equations outline a fully three-dimensional mathematical problem that is very difficult to solve even with simplifying assumptions. Until recently, limitations in computational power forced these equations to be simplified to an inviscid two-dimensional problem with pseudo losses. Before the advent of computers, these equations were almost always simplified to a one-dimensional problem. Solving this one-dimensional problem is still valuable today and is often termed mean-line analysis. Even with all of this simplification, it still requires large textbooks to outline and large computer programs to solve practically.

=== Conservation of mass ===
Also termed continuity, this fundamental equation written in general form is as follows:

$$\frac{\partial \rho}{\partial t} + \nabla \cdot (\rho \mathbf{v}) = 0$$

=== Conservation of momentum ===
Also termed the Navier–Stokes equations, this fundamental is derivable from Newton's second law when applied to fluid motion. Written in compressible form for a Newtonian fluid, this equation may be written as follows:

$$\rho\left(\frac{\partial\mathbf{v}}{\partial t} + \mathbf{v} \cdot \nabla\mathbf{v}\right) =
-\nabla p + \mu\nabla^2\mathbf{v} + \left( \frac{1}{3} \mu + \mu^v\right) \nabla\left(\nabla \cdot \mathbf{v} \right) + \mathbf{f}$$

=== Conservation of energy ===
The first law of thermodynamics is the statement of the conservation of energy. Under specific conditions, the operation of a centrifugal compressor is considered a reversible process. For a reversible process, the total amount of heat added to a system can be expressed as $\delta Q=TdS$, where $T$ is temperature and $S$ is entropy. Therefore, for a reversible process:

$$dU=TdS-pdV.\,$$

Since U, S, and V are thermodynamic functions of state, the above relation holds also for non-reversible changes. The above equation is known as the fundamental thermodynamic relation.

=== Equation of state ===
The classical ideal gas law may be written:

$${\ pV = nRT}.$$

The ideal gas law may also be expressed as

$${\ p = \rho (\gamma-1)U},$$

where $\rho$ is the density, $\gamma = C_p/C_v$ is the adiabatic index (ratio of specific heats), $U = C_vT$ is the internal energy per unit mass (the "specific internal energy"), $C_v$ is the specific heat at constant volume, and $C_p$ is the specific heat at constant pressure.

With regard to the equation of state, it is important to remember that while air and nitrogen properties (near standard atmospheric conditions) are easily and accurately estimated by this simple relationship, there are many centrifugal compressor applications where the ideal relationship is inadequate. For example, centrifugal compressors used for large air-conditioning systems (water chillers) use a refrigerant as a working gas that cannot be modeled as an ideal gas. Another example is centrifugal compressors designed and built for the petroleum industry. Most of the hydrocarbon gases, such as methane and ethylene, are best modeled with a real-gas equation of state rather than the ideal gas law.

== Pros and cons ==
Pros

- Centrifugal compressors offer the advantages of simplicity of manufacturing and relatively low cost. This is due to requiring fewer stages to achieve the same pressure rise.
- Centrifugal compressors are used throughout industry because they have fewer rubbing parts, are relatively energy-efficient, and give higher and non-oscillating constant airflow than a similarly-sized reciprocating compressor or any other positive-displacement pump.
- Centrifugal compressors are mostly used as turbochargers and in small gas-turbine engines like in an auxiliary power unit and as main engine for smaller aircraft like helicopters. A significant reason for this is that with current technology, the equivalent airflow axial compressor will be less efficient due primarily to a combination of rotor and variable stator tip-clearance losses.

Cons

- Their main drawback is that they cannot achieve the high compression ratio of reciprocating compressors without multiple stages. There are few one-stage centrifugal compressors capable of pressure ratios over 10:1, due to stress considerations which severely limit the compressor's safety, durability, and life expectancy.
- Centrifugal compressors are impractical, compared to axial compressors, for use in large gas turbines and turbojet engines propelling large aircraft, due to the resulting weight and stress, and to the frontal area presented by the large diameter of the radial diffuser.

== Structural mechanics, manufacture, and design compromise ==
Ideally, centrifugal compressor impellers have thin and strong airfoil blades, each mounted on a light rotor. This material would be easy and cheap to machine or cast. Additionally, it would generate no operating noise, and have a long life while operating in any environment.

From the very start of the aero-thermodynamic design process, the aerodynamic considerations and optimizations [29,30] are critical to have a successful design. During the design phase, the centrifugal impeller's material and manufacturing method must be accounted for, whether it be plastic for a vacuum cleaner blower, aluminum alloy for a turbocharger, steel alloy for an air compressor, or titanium alloy for a gas turbine. It is a combination of the centrifugal-compressor impeller shape, its operating environment, its material, and its manufacturing method that determines the impeller's structural integrity.

== See also ==
- Angular momentum
- Axial compressor
- Centrifugal force
- Centripetal force
- Coandă effect
- Computational fluid dynamics
- Compressibility
- Compressor map
- Coriolis force
- Darcy–Weisbach equation
- Enthalpy
- Entropy
- Euler equations (fluid dynamics)
- Finite element method
- Fluid dynamics
- Gas laws
- Gustaf de Laval
- Ideal gas law
- Kinematics
- Mach number
- Multiphase flow
- Navier–Stokes equations
- Real gas
- Reynolds-averaged Navier–Stokes equations
- Reynolds transport theorem
- Reynolds number
- Rossby number
- Three-dimensional losses and correlation in turbomachinery
- Turbulence
- Viscosity
- von Karman Institute for Fluid Dynamics
