= Turbomachinery =

Machine for exchanging energy with a fluid

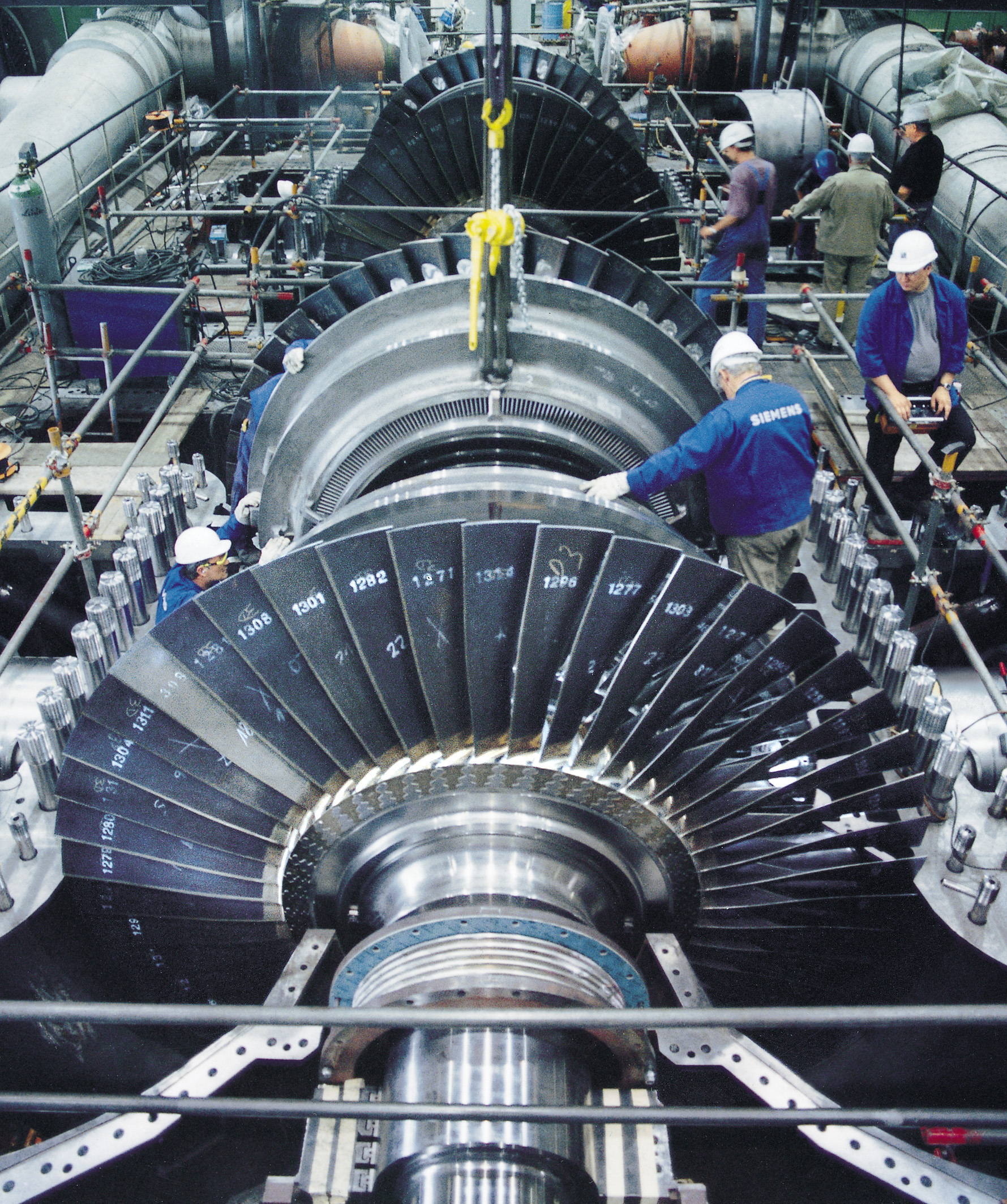
Mounting of a steam turbine produced by Siemens, Germany

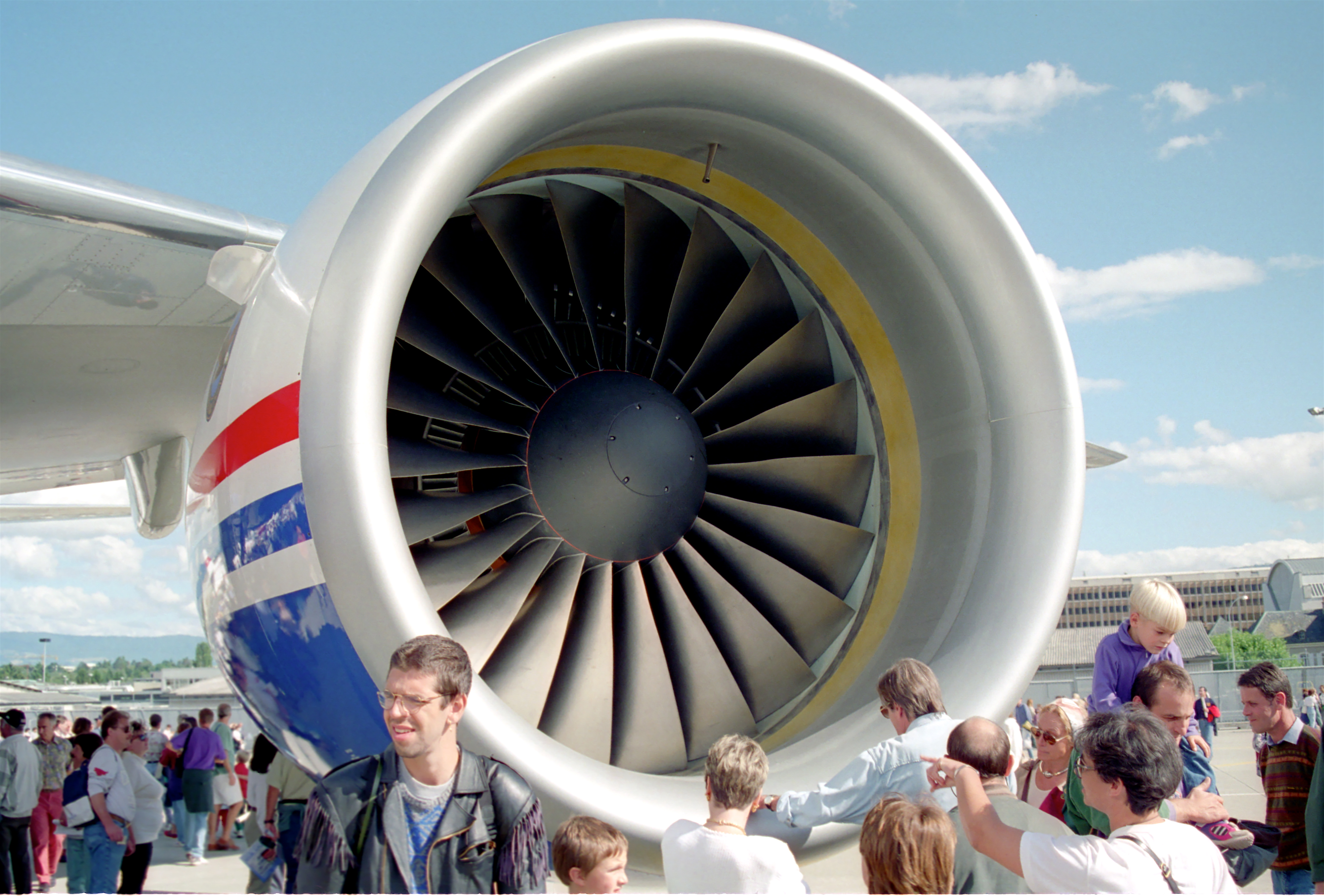
Aircraft engine, in this case on a Boeing 777

Turbomachinery, in mechanical engineering, describes machines that transfer energy between a rotor and a fluid, including both turbines and compressors. While a turbine transfers energy from a fluid to a rotor, a compressor transfers energy from a rotor to a fluid. It is an important application of fluid mechanics.

These two types of machines are governed by the same basic relationships including Newton's second law of motion and Euler's pump and turbine equation for compressible fluids. Centrifugal pumps are also turbomachines that transfer energy from a rotor to a fluid, usually a liquid, while turbines and compressors usually work with a gas.

== History ==
The first turbomachines could be identified as water wheels, which appeared between the 3rd and 1st centuries BCE in the Mediterranean region. These were used throughout the medieval period and began the first Industrial Revolution. When steam power started to be used, as the first power source driven by the combustion of a fuel rather than renewable natural power sources, this was as reciprocating engines. Primitive turbines and conceptual designs for them, such as the smoke jack, appeared intermittently but the temperatures and pressures required for a practically efficient turbine exceeded the manufacturing technology of the time. The first patent for gas turbines were filed in 1791 by John Barber. Practical hydroelectric water turbines and steam turbines did not appear until the 1880s. Gas turbines appeared in the 1930s.

The first impulse type turbine was created by Carl Gustaf de Laval in 1883. This was closely followed by the first practical reaction type turbine in 1884, built by Charles Parsons. Parsons’ first design was a multi-stage axial-flow unit, which George Westinghouse acquired and began manufacturing in 1895, while General Electric acquired de Laval's designs in 1897. Since then, development has skyrocketed from Parsons’ early design, producing 0.746 kW, to modern nuclear steam turbines producing upwards of 1500 MW. Furthermore, steam turbines accounted for roughly 45% of electrical power generated in the United States in 2021. Then the first functioning industrial gas turbines were used in the late 1890s to power street lights (Meher-Homji, 2000).

== Classification ==
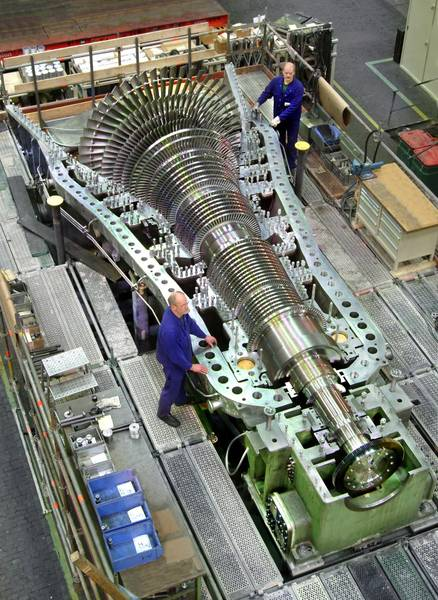
A steam turbine from MAN SE subsidiary MAN Turbo

In general, the two kinds of turbomachines encountered in practice are open and closed turbomachines. Open machines such as propellers, windmills, and unshrouded fans act on an infinite extent of fluid, whereas closed machines operate on a finite quantity of fluid as it passes through a housing or casing.

Turbomachines are also categorized according to the type of flow. When the flow is parallel to the axis of rotation, they are called axial flow machines, and when flow is perpendicular to the axis of rotation, they are referred to as radial (or centrifugal) flow machines. There is also a third category, called mixed flow machines, where both radial and axial flow velocity components are present.

Turbomachines may be further classified into two additional categories: those that absorb energy to increase the fluid pressure, i.e. pumps, fans, and compressors, and those that produce energy such as turbines by expanding flow to lower pressures. Of particular interest are applications which contain pumps, fans, compressors and turbines. These components are essential in almost all mechanical equipment systems, such as power and refrigeration cycles.

Classification of fluid machinery in species and groups
Machine type Group	Machinery	Combinations of power and machinery	Engines
Open turbomachine	Propeller		Wind turbines
Hydraulic fluid machinery (≈ incompressible fluids)	Centrifugal pumps, turbopumps, fans	Fluid couplings and clutches (hydrodynamic gearboxes); Voith turbo transmissions; pump–turbines (in pumped-storage hydroelectricity)	Water turbines
Thermal turbomachinery (compressible fluid)	Compressors	Gas turbines (Inlet consists of a compressor.)	Steam turbines, turbojet engines

== Turbomachines ==
=== Definition ===
Any device that extracts energy from or imparts energy to a continuously moving stream of fluid can be called a turbomachine. Elaborating, a turbomachine is a power or heat generating machine which employs the dynamic action of a rotating element, the rotor; the action of the rotor changes the energy level of the continuously flowing fluid through the machine. Turbines, compressors and fans are all members of this family of machines.

In contrast to positive displacement machines (particularly of the reciprocating type which are low speed machines based on the mechanical and volumetric efficiency considerations), the majority of turbomachines run at comparatively higher speeds without any mechanical problems and volumetric efficiency close to one hundred percent.

=== Categorization ===
==== Energy conversion ====
Turbomachines can be categorized on the basis of the direction of energy conversion:

- Absorb power to increase the fluid pressure or head (ducted fans, compressors and pumps).
- Produce power by expanding fluid to a lower pressure or head (hydraulic, steam and gas turbines).

==== Fluid flow ====
Turbomachines can be categorized on the basis of the nature of the flow path through the passage of the rotor:

Velocity diagram of an axial turbomachine

Axial flow turbomachines – When the path of the through-flow is wholly or mainly parallel to the axis of rotation, the device is termed an axial flow turbomachine. The radial component of the fluid velocity is negligible. Since there is no change in the direction of the fluid, several axial stages can be used to increase power output.

A Kaplan turbine is an example of an axial flow turbine.

In the figure:

- U = Blade velocity,
- V_{f} = Flow velocity,
- V = Absolute velocity,
- V_{r} = Relative velocity,
- V_{w} = Tangential or Whirl component of velocity.

Velocity diagram of a radial turbomachine

Radial flow turbomachines – When the path of the throughflow is wholly or mainly in a plane perpendicular to the rotation axis, the device is termed a radial flow turbomachine. Therefore, the change of radius between the entry and the exit is finite. A radial turbomachine can be inward or outward flow type depending on the purpose that needs to be served. The outward flow type increases the energy level of the fluid and vice versa. Due to continuous change in direction, several radial stages are generally not used.

A centrifugal pump is an example of a radial flow turbomachine.

Mixed flow turbomachines – When axial and radial flow are both present and neither is negligible, the device is termed a mixed flow turbomachine. It combines flow and force components of both radial and axial types.

A Francis turbine is an example of a mixed-flow turbine.

==== Physical action ====
Turbomachines can finally be classified on the relative magnitude of the pressure changes that take place across a stage:

An impulse turbine stage

Impulse Turbomachines operate by accelerating and changing the flow direction of fluid through a stationary nozzle (the stator blade) onto the rotor blade. The nozzle serves to change the incoming pressure into velocity, the enthalpy of the fluid decreases as the velocity increases. Pressure and enthalpy drop over the rotor blades is minimal. Velocity will decrease over the rotor.

Newton's second law describes the transfer of energy. Impulse turbomachines do not require a pressure casement around the rotor since the fluid jet is created by the nozzle prior to reaching the blading on the rotor.

A Pelton wheel is an impulse design.

A reaction turbine stage

Reaction Turbomachines operate by reacting to the flow of fluid through aerofoil shaped rotor and stator blades. The velocity of the fluid through the sets of blades increases slightly (as with a nozzle) as it passes from rotor to stator and vice versa. The velocity of the fluid then decreases again once it has passed between the gap. Pressure and enthalpy consistently decrease through the sets of blades.

Newton's third law describes the transfer of energy for reaction turbines. A pressure casement is needed to contain the working fluid. For compressible working fluids, multiple turbine stages are usually used to harness the expanding gas efficiently.

Most turbomachines use a combination of impulse and reaction in their design, often with impulse and reaction parts on the same blade.

== Dimensionless ratios to describe turbomachinery ==
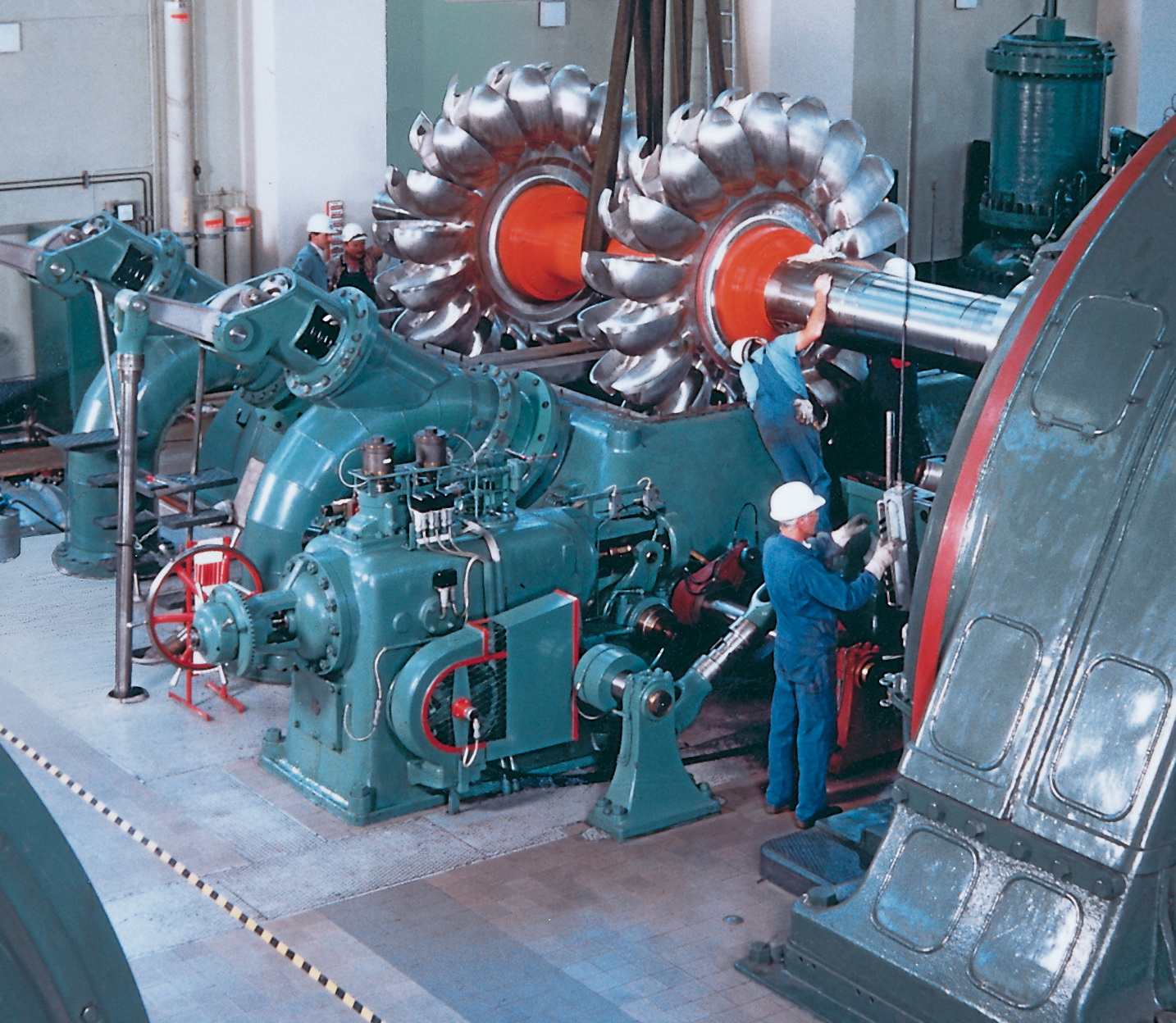
Pelton wheel being installed into Walchensee Hydroelectric Power Station

The following dimensionless ratios are often used for the characterisation of fluid machines. They allow a comparison of flow machines with different dimensions and boundary conditions.

1. Pressure range ψ
2. Flow coefficient φ (including delivery or volume number called)
3. Performance numbers λ
4. Run number σ
5. Diameter number δ

== Applications ==
=== Power Generation ===
Hydro electric – Hydro-electric turbomachinery uses potential energy stored in water to flow over an open impeller to turn a generator which creates electricity

Steam turbines – Steam turbines used in power generation come in many different variations. The overall principle is high pressure steam is forced over blades attached to a shaft, which turns a generator. As the steam travels through the turbine, it passes through smaller blades causing the shaft to spin faster, creating more electricity.

Gas turbines – Gas turbines work much like steam turbines. Air is forced in through a series of blades that turn a shaft. Then fuel is mixed with the air and causes a combustion reaction, increasing the power. This then causes the shaft to spin faster, creating more electricity.

Windmills – Also known as a wind turbine, windmills are increasing in popularity for their ability to efficiently use the wind to generate electricity. Although they come in many shapes and sizes, the most common one is the large three-blade. The blades work on the same principle as an airplane wing. As wind passes over the blades, it creates an area of low and high pressure, causing the blade to move, spinning a shaft and creating electricity. It is most like a steam turbine, but works with an infinite supply of wind.

=== Marine ===
Steam turbine – Steam turbines in marine applications are very similar to those in power generation. The few differences between them are size and power output. Steam turbines on ships are much smaller because they don't need to power a whole town. They aren't very common because of their high initial cost, high specific fuel consumption, and expensive machinery that goes with it.

Gas turbines – Gas turbines in marine applications are becoming more popular due to their smaller size, increased efficiency, and ability to burn cleaner fuels. They run just like gas turbines for power generation, but are also much smaller and do require more machinery for propulsion. They are most popular in naval ships as they can be at a dead stop to full power in minutes (Kayadelen, 2013), and are much smaller for a given amount of power.

Water jet – Essentially a water jet drive is like an aircraft turbojet with the difference that the operating fluid is water instead of air. Water jets are best suited to fast vessels and are thus used often by the military. Water jet propulsion has many advantages over other forms of marine propulsion, such as stern drives, outboard motors, shafted propellers and surface drives.

=== Auto ===
Air and exhaust flow through engine and turbocharger

Turbochargers – Turbochargers are one of the most popular turbomachines. They are used mainly for adding power to engines by adding more air. It combines both forms of turbomachines. Exhaust gases from the engine spin a bladed wheel, much like a turbine. That wheel then spins another bladed wheel, sucking and compressing outside air into the engine.

Superchargers – Superchargers are used for engine-power enhancement as well, but only work off the principle of compression. They use the mechanical power from the engine to spin a screw or vane, some way to suck in and compress the air into the engine.

=== General ===
Pumps – Pumps are another very popular turbomachine. Although there are very many different types of pumps, they all do the same thing. Pumps are used to move fluids around using some sort of mechanical power, from electric motors to full size diesel engines. Pumps have thousands of uses, and are the true basis to turbomachinery (Škorpík, 2017).

Air compressors – Air compressors are another very popular turbomachine. They work on the principle of compression by sucking in and compressing air into a holding tank. Air compressors are one of the most basic turbomachines.

Fans – Fans are the most general type of turbomachines.

=== Aerospace ===
Gas turbines – Aerospace gas turbines, more commonly known as jet engines, are the most common gas turbines.

Turbopumps – Rocket engines require very high propellant pressures and mass flow rates, meaning their pumps require a lot of power. One of the most common solutions to this issue is to use a turbopump that extracts energy from an energetic fluid flow. The source of this energetic fluid flow could be one or a combination of many things, including the decomposition of hydrogen peroxide, the combustion of a portion of the propellants, or even the heating of cryogenic propellants run through coolant jackets in the combustion chamber's walls.

== Partial list of turbomachine topics ==
Many types of dynamic continuous flow turbomachinery exist. Below is a partial list of these types. What is notable about these turbomachines is that the same fundamentals apply to all. Certainly there are significant differences between these machines and between the types of analysis that are typically applied to specific cases. This does not negate the fact that they are unified by the same underlying physics of fluid dynamics, gas dynamics, aerodynamics, hydrodynamics, and thermodynamics.

- Axial compressor
- Axial fan
- Centrifugal compressor
- Centrifugal fan
- Centrifugal pump
- Centrifugal-type supercharger
- Exoskeletal engine
- Francis turbine
- Gas turbine
- Industrial fans
- Jet engine
- Mechanical fan
- Mixed flow compressor
- Radial turbine
- Steam turbine
- Turbocharger
- Turboexpander
- Turbofans
- Turbojet
- Turboprop
- Turbopump
- Turboshaft
- Turbines
- Water turbine

== See also ==
- Blade solidity
- Secondary flow in turbomachinery
- Slip factor
- Three-dimensional losses and correlation in turbomachinery

== Sources ==
- S. M. Yahya. "Turbines Compressors and Fans". 1987. McGraw Hill.
- Meher-Homji, Cyrus B. (2000). The Historical Evolution Of Turbomachinery. Turbomachinery Laboratory Turbomachinery and Pump Symposia. pp. 281–322. doi:10.21423/R1X948. hdl:1969.1/163364.
- Nagpurwala, Q. (n.d.). Steam Turbines. Retrieved April 10, 2017, from http://164.100.133.129:81/eCONTENT/Uploads/13-Steam%20Turbines%20%5BCompatibility%20Mode%5D.pdf
- Soares, C. M. (n.d.). GAS TURBINES IN SIMPLE CYCLE & COMBINED CYCLE APPLICATIONS. 1-72. Retrieved April 10, 2017, from https://www.netl.doe.gov/File%20Library/Research/Coal/energy%20systems/turbines/handbook/1-1.pdf
- Perlman, U. H. (2016, December 2). Hydroelectric power: How it works. Retrieved April 10, 2017, from https://water.usgs.gov/edu/hyhowworks.html
- Škorpík, J. (2017, January 1). Lopatkový stroj-English version. Retrieved April 9, 2017, from http://www.transformacni-technologie.cz/en_11.html
- Kayadelen, H. (2013). Marine Gas Turbines. 7th International Advanced Technologies Symposium. Retrieved April 15, 2017.
