= Exoskeletal engine =

Concept in turbomachinery design

The exoskeletal engine (ESE) is a concept in turbomachinery design. Current gas turbine engines have central rotating shafts and fan-discs and are constructed mostly from heavy metals. They require lubricated bearings and need extensive cooling for hot components. They are also subject to severe imbalance (or vibrations) that could wipe out the whole rotor stage, are prone to high- and low-cycle fatigue, and subject to catastrophic failure due to disc bursts from high tensile loads, consequently requiring heavy containment devices. To address these limitations, the ESE concept turns the conventional configuration inside-out and utilizes a drum-type rotor design for the turbomachinery in which the rotor blades are attached to the inside of a rotating drum instead of radially outwards from a shaft and discs. Multiple drum rotors could be used in a multi-spool design.

== Design ==
Fundamentally, the ESE drum-rotor configuration typically consists of four concentric open-ended drums or shells:

- an outer shell (engine casing) that both supports the bearings for the drum-rotor shell and constrains it,
- the drum-rotor shell that rotates within the bearings and carries the compressor- and turbine blades,
- a static stator shell that supports the guide vanes,
- a hollow static inner shell that provides a flow path through the centre of the engine.

In the ESE design, the rotating blades are primarily in radial compression as opposed to radial tension, which means that materials that do not possess high-tensile strength, such as ceramic materials, can be used for their construction. Ceramics behave well in compressive loading situations where brittle fracture is minimized, and would provide greater operating efficiency through higher operating temperatures and lighter engine weight when compared to the metal alloys that typically are used in turbomachinery components. The ESE design and the use of composite materials could also reduce the part count, reduce or eliminate cooling, and result in increased component life. The use of ceramics would also be a beneficial feature for hypersonic propulsion systems, where high stagnation temperatures can exceed the limits of traditional turbomachinery materials.

The cavity within the inner shell could be exploited in several different ways. In subsonic applications, venting the centre cavity with a free-stream flow could potentially contribute to a large noise reduction; while in supersonic-hypersonic applications it might be used to house a ramjet or scramjet (or other devices such as a pulse detonation engine) as part of a turbine-based combined-cycle engine. Such an arrangement could reduce the overall length of the propulsion system and thereby reduce weight and drag significantly.

== Summarized potential advantages ==
From Chamis and Blankson:

- Eliminate disk and bore stresses
- Utilize low-stress bearings
- Increase rotor speed
- Reduce airfoil thickness
- Increase flutter boundaries
- Minimize/eliminate containment requirements
- Increase high mass flow rate
- Reduce weight by 50 percent
- Decrease turbine temperature for same thrust
- Decrease emissions
- Provide higher thrust-to-weight ratio
- Improve specific fuel consumption
- Increase blade low-cycle and high-cycle fatigue lives
- Reduce engine diameter
- Reduce parts count
- Decrease maintenance cost
- Minimize/eliminate sealing and cooling requirements
- Minimize/eliminate blade-flow losses, blade and case wear
- Free core for combined turboram jet cycles
- Reduce noise
- Expedite aircraft/engine integration
- Minimize/eliminate notch-sensitive material issues

== Challenges ==
One of the major challenges is in bearing design as there are no known lubricated systems that can handle the magnitude of velocity encountered in the ESE; foil- and magnetic bearings have been suggested as possible solutions to this problem.

- Foil bearings are noncontacting and ride on a thin film of air, which is generated hydrodynamically by the rotational speed, to suspend and centre the shaft. Drawbacks for the foil system include the high start-up torque, the need for set-down/lift-off mechanical bearings and associated positioning hardware, and the high temperatures generated by this system.
- For the large-diameter magnetic bearing system required in the ESE, stiffness and radial growth after spin-up are problems that would be encountered. Radial growth of sufficient magnitude would result in stability problems, and a magnet pole positioning system would be required to maintain the appropriate clearances for the operation of the system. This positioning system would require high-speed sensing and positioning. A passive magnetic laminate and its mounting hardware would require high structural integrity to resist the extremely high inertial forces and would most likely drive an increase in weight.

Although both bearing systems theoretically meet the requirements of the exoskeletal application, neither technology is currently ready for operation at practical sizes. Developments in foil bearing technology indicate it may take 20 years to achieve foil bearings for this diameter, and magnetic bearings appear to be too heavy for this application and would also face a lengthy technology development programme.

== See also ==
- Index of aviation articles
- Components of jet engines
- List of aircraft engines
