= Three-dimensional losses and correlation in turbomachinery =

Three-dimension losses and correlation in turbomachinery refers to the measurement of flow-fields in three dimensions, where measuring the loss of smoothness of flow, and resulting inefficiencies, becomes difficult, unlike two-dimensional losses where mathematical complexity is substantially less.

Three-dimensionality takes into account large pressure gradients in every direction, design/curvature of blades, shock waves, heat transfer, cavitation, and viscous effects, which generate secondary flow, vortices, tip leakage vortices, and other effects that interrupt smooth flow and cause loss of efficiency. Viscous effects in turbomachinery block flow by the formation of viscous layers around blade profiles, which affects pressure rise and fall and reduces the effective area of a flow field. Interaction between these effects increases rotor instability and decreases the efficiency of turbomachinery.

In calculating three-dimensional losses, every element affecting a flow path is taken into account—such as axial spacing between vane and blade rows, end-wall curvature, radial distribution of pressure gradient, hub/tip ratio, dihedral, lean, tip clearance, flare, aspect ratio, skew, sweep, platform cooling holes, surface roughness, and off-take bleeds. Associated with blade profiles are parameters such as camber distribution, stagger angle, blade spacing, blade camber, chord, surface roughness, leading- and trailing-edge radii, and maximum thickness.

Two-dimensional losses are easily evaluated using Navier-Stokes equations, but three-dimensional losses are difficult to evaluate; so, correlation is used, which is difficult with so many parameters. So, correlation based on geometric similarity has been developed in many industries, in the form of charts, graphs, data statistics, and performance data.

== Types of losses ==
Three-dimensional losses are generally classified as:

1. Three-dimensional profile losses
2. Three-dimensional shock losses
3. Secondary flow
4. Endwall losses in axial turbomachinery
5. Tip leakage flow losses
6. Blade boundary layer losses

== Three-dimensional profile losses ==
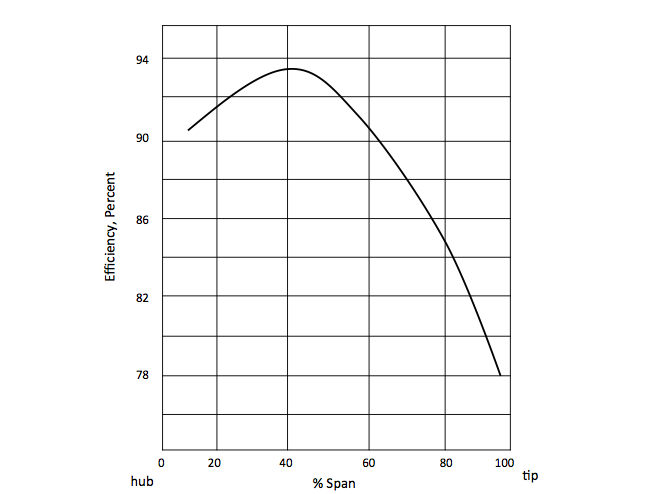
Effect on efficiency by blade profile losses

The main points to consider are:

- Profile losses that occur due to the curvature of blades, which includes span-wise mixing of flow field, in addition to two-dimensional mixing losses (which can be predicted using Navier-Stokes equations).
- Major losses in rotors that are caused by radial pressure gradient from midspan to tip (flow ascending to tip).
- Reduction in high losses between annulus wall and tip clearance region, which includes the trailing edge of a blade profile. This is due to flow mixing and flow redistribution at the inner radius as flow proceeds downstream.
- Between the hub and annulus wall, losses are prominent due to three-dimensionality.
- In single-stage turbomachinery, large radial pressure gradient losses at exit of flow from rotor.
- Platform cooling increases the endwall flow loss and coolant air increases profile loss.
- Navier-Stokes identifies many of the losses when some assumptions are made, such as unseparated flow. Here correlation is no longer justified.

== Three-dimensional shock losses ==
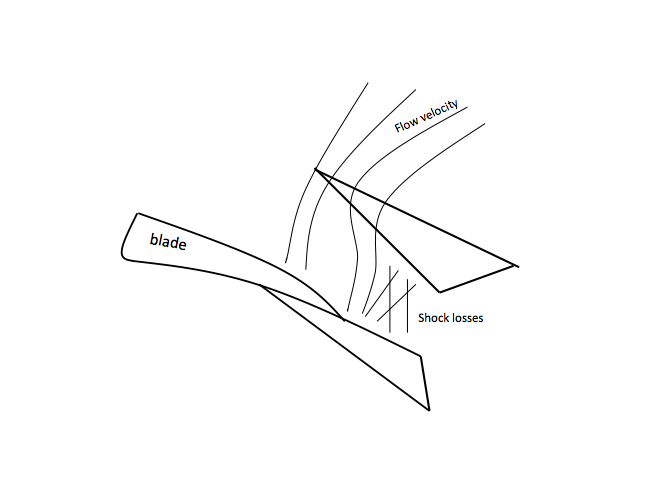
Shock losses due to accumulation of flow

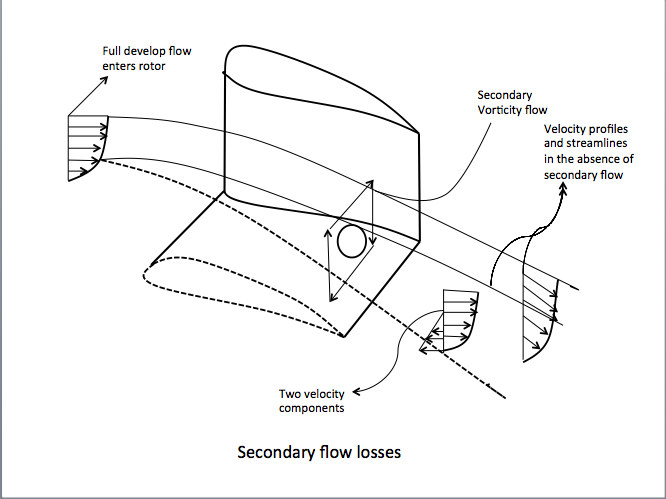
Generation of secondary flow due blade profile

The main points to consider are:

- Shock losses continuously increase from the hub to tip of the blade in both supersonic and transonic rotors.
- Shock losses are accompanied by shock-boundary-layer interaction losses, boundary-layer losses in profile secondary flow, and tip clearance effects.
- From the Mach number prospective, fluid inside rotor is in supersonic phase except at initial hub entry.
- The Mach number increases gradually from midspan to tip. At the tip, the effect is less than secondary flow, tip clearance effect, and annulus wall boundary-layer effect.
- In a turbofan, shock losses increase overall efficiency by 2% because of the absence of tip clearance effect and secondary flow being present.
- Correlation depends on many parameters and is difficult to calculate.
- Correlation based on geometric similarity is used.

== Secondary flow ==
The main points to consider are:

- The rotation of a blade row causes non-uniformity in radial velocity, stagnation pressure, stagnation enthalpy, and stagnation temperature. Distribution in both tangential and radial directions generates secondary flow.
- Secondary flow generates two velocity components V_{y}, V_{z}, hence introducing three-dimensionality in the flow field.
- The two components of velocity result in flow-turning at the tailing end of the blade profile, which directly affects pressure rise-and-fall in turbomachinery. Hence efficiency decreases.
- Secondary flow generates vibration, noise, and flutter because of unsteady pressure field between blades and rotor–stator interaction.
- Secondary flow introduces vortex cavitation, which diminishes flow rate, decreases performance, and damages the blade profile.
- The temperature in turbomachinery is affected.
- Correlation for secondary flow, given by Dunham (1970), is given by:

                   ζs = (0.0055 + 0.078(δ1/C)1/2)CL2 (cos3α2/cos3αm) (C/h) (C/S)2 ( 1/cos ά1)

where ζ_{s} = average secondary flow loss coefficient; α_{2}, α_{m} = flow angles; δ_{1}/C = inlet boundary layer; and C,S,h = blade geometry.

== Endwall losses in axial flow in turbomachinery ==
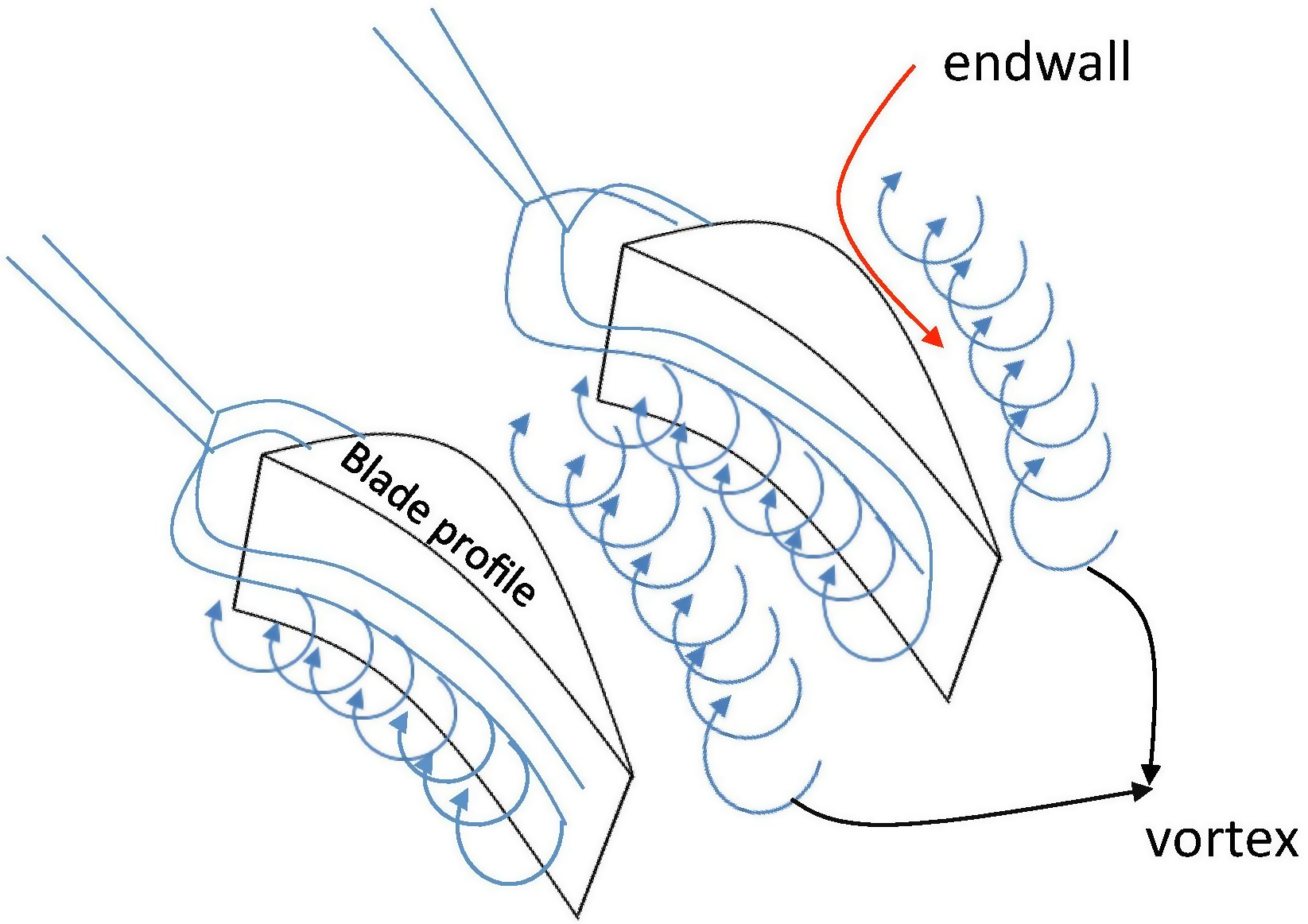
Endwall losses due to vortex

The main points to consider are:

- In a turbine, secondary flow forces the wall boundary layer toward the suction side of the rotor, where mixing of blade and wall boundary takes place, resulting in endwall losses.
- The secondary flow carries core losses away from the wall and blade boundary layer, through formation of vortices. So, peak loss occurs away from endwall.
- Endwall losses are high in stator (Francis turbine/Kaplan turbine) and nozzle vane (Pelton turbine), and the loss distribution is different for turbine and compressor, due to flows being opposite to each other.
- Due to the presence of vortices, large flow-turning and secondary flow result to form a complex flow field, and interaction between these effects increases endwall losses.
- In total loss, endwall losses form the fraction of secondary losses given by Gregory-Smith, et al., 1998. Hence secondary flow theory for small flow-turning fails.
- Correlation for endwall losses in an axial-flow turbine is given by:

                  ζ = ζp + ζew
     ζ = ζp[ 1 + ( 1 + ( 4ε / ( ρ2V2/ρ1V1 )1/2 ) ) ( S cos α2 - tTE )/h ]

where ζ=total losses, ζ_{p}=blade profile losses, ζ_{ew}=endwall losses.

- The expression for endwall losses in an axial-flow compressor is given by:

                η = ή ( 1 - ( δh* + δt*)/h ) / ( 1 - (  Fθh +  Fθt ) / h )

where η=efficiency in absence of endwall boundary layer, where h refers to the hub and t refers to the tip. The values of F_{θ} and δ^{*} are derived from the graph or chart.

== Tip-leakage flow losses ==
Tip leakage losses due to tip endwall

The main points to consider are:

- The rotation of a rotor in turbomachinery induces a pressure differences between opposite sides of the blade profile, resulting in tip leakage.
- In a turbomachinery rotor, a gap between the annulus wall and the blade causes leakage, which also occurs in the gap between the rotating hub and stator.
- Direct loss through clearance volume, as no angular momentum is transferred to fluid. So, no work is done.
- Leakage, and its interaction with other losses in the flow field, is complex; and hence, at the tip, it has a more pronounced effect than secondary flow.
- Leakage-flow induced three-dimensionality, like the mixing of leakage flow with vortex formation, entrainment process, diffusion and convection. This results in aerodynamics losses and inefficiency.
- Tip leakage and clearance loss account for 20–40% of total losses.
- The effects of cooling in turbines causes vibration, noise, flutter, and high blade stress.
- Leakage flow causes low static pressure in the core area, increasing the risk of cavitation and blade damage.
- The leakage velocity is given as:

                QL = 2 ( ( Pp - Ps ) / ρ )1/2

- The leakage flow sheet due to velocity induced by the vortex is given in Rains, 1954:

               a/τ = 0.14 ( d/τ  ( CL )1/2 )0.85

- Total loss in clearance volume is given by two equations-

               ζL ~ ( CL2 * C * τ * cos2β1 ) / ( A * S * S * cos2βm )

               ζW ~ ( δS* + δP* / S ) * ( 1 / A ) * ( ( CL )3/2) * ( τ / S )3/2Vm3 / ( V2 * V12 )

== See also ==
- Axial compressor
- Centrifugal
- Centrifugal compressor
- Centrifugal fan
- Centrifugal pump
- Francis turbine
- Kaplan turbine
- Mechanical fan
- Secondary flow
- Turbomachinery

== Journals ==
- K. F. C. Yiu; M. Zangeneh (2000). "Three-Dimensional Automatic Optimization Method for Turbomachinery Blade Design". Journal of Propulsion and Power. 16 (6): 1174–1181. doi:10.2514/2.5694.
- Piotr Lampart. "Tip Leakage Flows in Turbines" (PDF). Task Quarterly. 10: 139–175.
- Horlock J H, Lakshminarayana B (1973). "Secondary Flows: Theory, Experiment, and Application in Turbomachinery Aerodynamics". Annual Review of Fluid Mechanics. 5: 247–280. Bibcode:1973AnRFM...5..247H. doi:10.1146/annurev.fl.05.010173.001335.
- D. R. Waigh; R. J. Kind (1998). "Improved Aerodynamic Characterization of Regular Three-Dimensional Roughness". AIAA Journal. 36 (6): 1117–9. Bibcode:1998AIAAJ..36.1117W. doi:10.2514/2.491.
- J. D. Denton; W. N. Dawes (1998). "Computational fluid dynamics for turbomachinery design". Proceedings of the Institution of Mechanical Engineers, Part C: Journal of Mechanical Engineering Science. 213 (2): 107–124. doi:10.1243/0954406991522211. S2CID 39967828.
