= Compressed Air and Gas Institute =

American trade association

Logo of the Compressed Air and Gas Institute.

Compressed Air and Gas Institute (CAGI) is the industry association located in Cleveland, Ohio, USA. It was founded in 1915. CAGI represents manufacturers of compressed air system equipment, including air compressors, blowers, pneumatic tools, and air and gas drying and filtration equipment. It also develops standards for compressors, compressor-related testing, air dryers, filters and portable air tools, many prepared and updated in coordination with other standards organizations, including Pneurop and the American National Standards Institute.
