= Alexander Sablukov =

Russian general and inventor

- Александр Александрович Саблуков
- Died: March 15, 1857 (aged 73)
- Military career
- Allegiance: Russian
- Rank: Lieutenant General
- Other work: Engineer and inventor

Alexander Alexandrovich Sablukov (Russian: Александр Александрович Саблуков; 3 November [O.S. 23 October] 1783–15 March [O.S. 3 March] 1857) was a Russian Lieutenant General, engineer and inventor. Sablukov is credited with the invention of the centrifugal fan (1832) and contribution to the development of the centrifugal pump.

In 1845 Sablukov was in correspondence with German inventor Karl Ernst von Baer.

== Publications ==
- Annuaire du Journal des Mines de Russie, 1836, p. 162.
- Mémoire concernant quelques applications et la construction de machines généralement connues sous le nom de ventilateurs ou tarares et l’application nouvelle du même principe pour le déplacement des corps liquides, par Alexandre de Sabloukoff, lieutenant-général du corps des ingénieurs des mines; Paris, 1841
- Ueber die zwekmäßige Construction und einige nüzliche Anwendungen der Ventilatoren oder Windflügel; von Hrn. Alexander v. Sabloukoff. Dingler’s Polytechnisches Journal, Issue 81, 1841, Article XIV., p. 52.

== See also ==
- List of Russian inventors
