= Centrifugal fan =

Mechanical fan that forces fluid to move radially outward

A typical backward-curved centrifugal fan, in which the blades curve away from the direction in which they rotate

A centrifugal fan is a mechanical device for moving air or other gases from the rotating inlet, in a direction perpendicular to the axis of rotation of the fan, to an outlet. Centrifugal fans often contain a ducted housing to direct outgoing air in a specific direction or across an electronic device's heat sink; such a fan is also called a blower, blower fan, turbo fan or squirrel-cage fan (because it resembles a hamster wheel). Tiny ones used in computers are sometimes called biscuit blowers. They are typically used in ducted applications to either push or pull air through ductwork or a heat exchanger; similar to impellers. Centrifugal fans can provide similar air movement from a smaller fan package, and overcome higher resistance in air streams than a comparably sized axial fans.

Centrifugal fans use the kinetic energy of the impellers to move the air stream, which in turn moves against the resistance caused by ducts, dampers and other components. Centrifugal fans displace air radially, changing the direction (typically by 90°) of the airflow. They are sturdy, quiet, reliable, and capable of operating over a wide range of speeds.

Centrifugal fans are, like axial fans, constant-volume devices, meaning that at a constant fan speed, such device moves a constant volume of air rather than a constant mass. This means that at a constant fan speed the air velocity and volume in a system is static, but the mass of air flowing will vary based on the density of the air. Variations in density can be caused by changes in incoming air temperature and elevation above sea level, making these fans unsuitable for applications where a constant mass of air is required to be provided.

Centrifugal fans are not positive-displacement devices that have certain advantages and disadvantages when contrasted with positive-displacement blowers: centrifugal fans are more efficient, whereas positive-displacement blowers typically have a lower capital cost, and are capable of achieving much higher compression ratios. In comparison to axial fans for residential, industrial, and commercial applications, axial fans typically can operate at higher volumes and lower static pressures, and have higher efficiency. Therefore axial fans are usually used for high volume air movement, such as warehouse exhaust or room circulation, while centrifugal fans are used to move air in ducted applications such as a house or typical office environment.

The centrifugal fan has a drum shape composed of a number of fan blades mounted around a hub. As shown in the animated figure, the hub turns on a driveshaft mounted in bearings in the fan housing. The gas enters from the side of the fan wheel, turns 90 degrees and accelerates due to centrifugal force as it flows over the fan blades and exits the fan housing.

== History ==
The earliest mention of centrifugal fans was in 1556 by Georg Bauer (Latin: Georgius Agricola) in his book De Re Metallica, where he shows how such fans were used to ventilate mines. Thereafter, centrifugal fans gradually fell into disuse. It wasn't until the early decades of the nineteenth century that interest in centrifugal fans revived. In 1815 the Marquis de Chabannes advocated the use of a centrifugal fan and took out a British patent in the same year. In 1827, Edwin A. Stevens of Bordentown, New Jersey, installed a fan for blowing air into the boilers of the steamship North America. Similarly, in 1832, the Swedish-American engineer John Ericsson used a centrifugal fan as blower on the steamship Corsair. A centrifugal fan was invented by Russian military engineer Alexander Sablukov in 1832, and was used both in the Russian light industry (such as sugar making) and abroad.

One of the most important developments for the mining industry was the Guibal fan, which was patented in Belgium in 1862 by the French engineer Théophile Guibal. The Guibal fan had a spiral case surrounding the fan blades, as well as a flexible shutter to control the escape velocity, which made it far superior to previous open-fan designs and led to the possibility of mining at great depths. Such fans were used extensively for mine ventilation throughout Britain.

== Construction ==
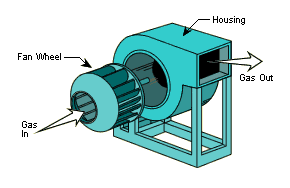
Figure 1: Components of a centrifugal fan

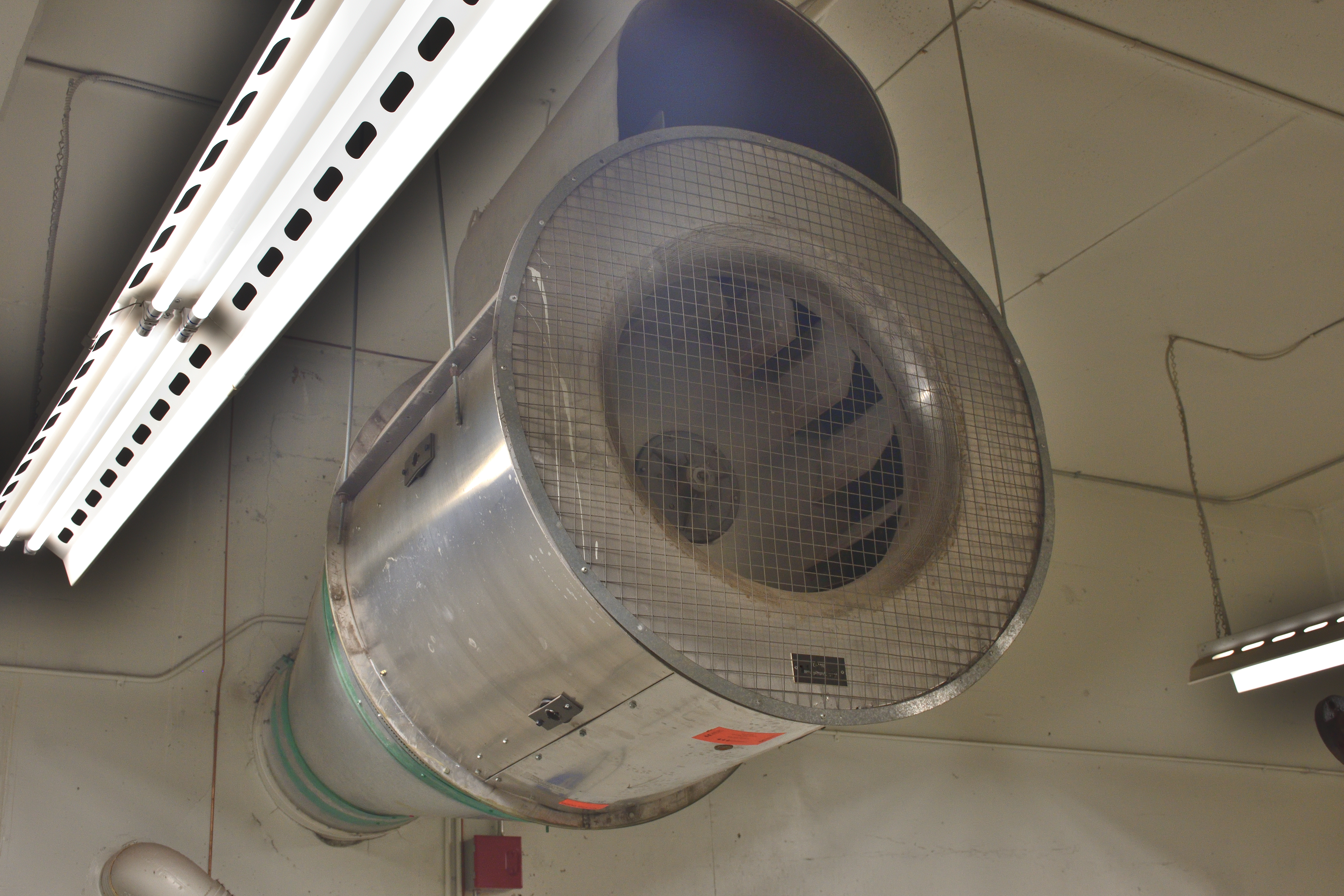
An external motor belt driven inline centrifugal fan discharging inline to the exterior of a building through a duct. Unlike non-inline/non-concentric impeller casing design with a cutoff blade above, the concentrically symmetric cylinder casing and impeller geometry of inline type redirects the outflow around so that it is parallel to the inflow of gases.

The main parts of a centrifugal fan are:

1. Fan housing
2. Impellers
3. Inlet and outlet ducts
4. Drive shaft
5. Drive mechanism
6. Fan Dampers and Vanes
7. Inlet and outlet ducts
8. Fan blades
9. Fan discharge casing

Other components used may include bearings, couplings, impeller locking device, fan discharge casing, shaft seal plates etc.

=== Drive mechanisms ===
The fan drive determines the speed of the fan wheel (impeller) and the extent to which this speed can be varied. There are two basic types of fan drives.

==== Direct ====
The fan wheel is linked directly to the shaft of an electric motor, as a consequence of such the rotational speeds of the fan wheel and motor are identical. Direct drive is the most efficient form of fan drive due to no losses from transferring the motor's rotational speed to the fan's.

Some centrifugal fans eliminate the motor shaft entirely by directly mounting the fan wheel (impeller) directly on the rotor by using an external rotor motor (the stator is inside the rotor).

==== Belt ====
A set of sheaves is mounted on the motor shaft and the fan wheel shaft, and a belt transmits the mechanical energy from the motor to the fan. Belts introduce an additional maintenance item.

The fan wheel speed depends upon the ratio of the diameter of the motor sheave to the diameter of the fan wheel sheave. Fan wheel speeds in belt-driven fans are fixed unless the belt(s) slip. Belt slippage reduces efficiency and can reduce the fan wheel speed by several hundred revolutions per minute (RPM).

=== Bearings ===
Bearings are an important part of a fan. Sleeve-ring bearings are used for smaller fans such as computer fans, while larger residential and commercial applications use ball bearings. Industrial applications may used specialized bearings such as water-cooled sleeve bearings for exhausting hot gasses.

Many turbo blowers use either an air bearing or a magnetic bearing.

Magnetic bearing blowers provide low transmitted vibration, high-speed levitation, low power consumption, high reliability, oil-free operation and tolerance to particle contaminants in the air stream.

=== Speed control ===
Fan speed for modern fans is done through Variable Frequency Drives that directly control the motor speed, ramping up and down the speed of the motor to different airflows. The amount of air moved is non-linear with the motor speed, and must be individually balanced for each fan installation. Typically this is done at time of install by testing and balancing contractors, although some modern systems directly monitor airflow with instruments near the outlet, and can use the feedback to vary the motor speed.

Older fan installations would use inlet or outlet vane guides - metal flaps that could be adjusted open(lower static pressure, lower motor speed and increase airflow) or closed(raise static pressure, increase fan speed and lower airflow) on the outlet of the fan. Vane guides can be 6-10% less efficient than a VFD with each employing a different strategy to adjust airflow, as the VFD directly adjusts electricity input to the fan motor, while vanes adjust static pressure.

=== Fan wheel and blades ===
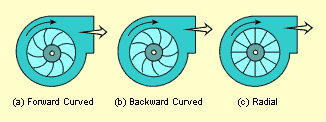
Figure 3: Centrifugal fan blades

The fan wheel consists of a hub with a number of fan blades attached that can be arranged in three different ways: forward-curved, backward-curved or radial. The fan wheel alone can have various balance tolerance grades according to AMCA 204-20.

==== Forward-curved ====
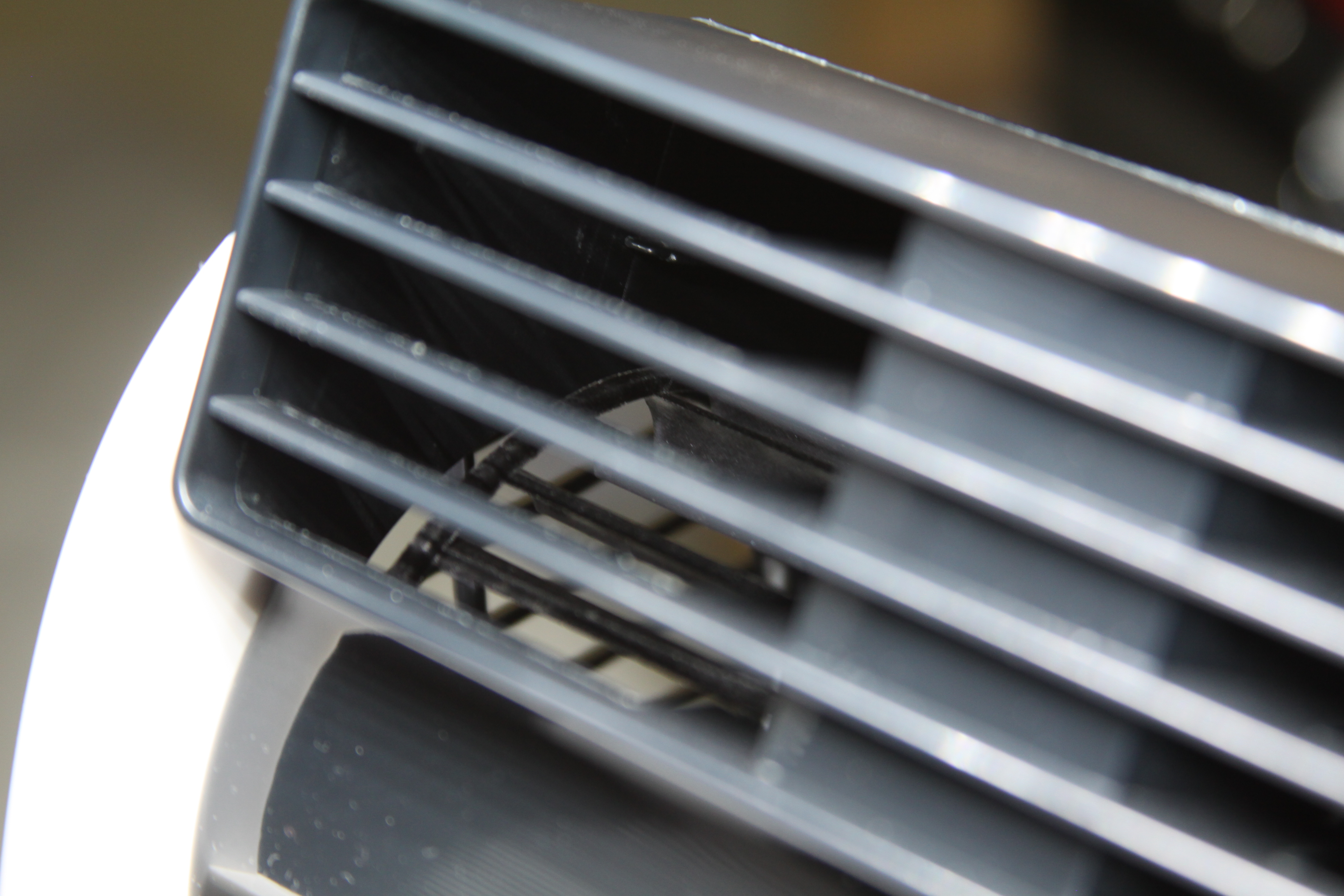
Forward-curved blades in a household fan

Forward-curved blades, as in Figure 3(a), curve in the direction of the fan wheel's rotation. These are especially sensitive to particulates and commonly are only specified for clean-air applications such as air conditioning. Forward-curved fans are typically used in applications where the static pressure requirement is too high for a vane axial fan or the smaller size of a centrifugal fan is required, but the noise characteristics of a backwards curved fan are disruptive for the space. They are capable of providing lower air flow with a higher increase in static pressure compared to a vane axial fan. They are typically used in fan coil units. They are less efficient than backwards curved fans.

==== Backward-curved ====
Backward-curved blades, as in Figure 3(b), curve against the direction of the fan wheel's rotation. Smaller blowers may have backward-inclined blades, which are straight, not curved. Larger backward-inclined/-curved blowers have blades whose backward curvatures mimic that of an airfoil cross section, but both designs provide good operating efficiency with relatively economical construction techniques. These types of blowers are designed to handle gas streams with low to moderate particulate loadings. They can be easily fitted with wear protection but certain blade curvatures can be prone to solids build-up.. Backward curved wheels are often heavier than corresponding forward-curved equivalents, as they run at higher speeds and require stronger construction.

Backward curved fans can have a high range of specific speeds but are most often used for medium specific speed applications—high pressure, medium flow applications such as in air handling units.

Backward-curved fans are more energy efficient than radial blade and forward curved fans and so, for high power applications may be a suitable alternative to the lower cost radial bladed fan.

==== Straight radial ====
Radial blowers, as in Figure 3(c), have wheels whose blades extend straight out from the centre of the hub. Radial bladed wheels are often used on particulate-laden gas streams because they are the least sensitive to solid build-up on the blades, but they are often characterized by greater noise output. Medium speeds, low volumes, and high pressures are more common with radial blowers, and are often used in vacuum cleaners, pneumatic material conveying systems, and similar processes.

== Principles of operation ==
The centrifugal fan uses the centrifugal power supplied from the rotation of impellers to increase the kinetic energy of air/gases. When the impellers rotate, the gas particles near the impellers are thrown off from the impellers, then move into the fan casing. As a result, the kinetic energy of gas is measured as pressure because of the system resistance offered by the casing and duct. The gas is then guided to the exit via outlet ducts. After the gas is thrown-off, the gas pressure in the middle region of the impellers decreases. The gas from the impeller eye rushes in to normalize this. This cycle repeats and therefore the gas can be continuously transferred.

=== Difference between fans and blowers ===
The primary property that distinguishes a fan from a blower is the achievable pressure ratio. A properly designed blower can produce a higher pressure ratio and enabling a higher power density. Per the American Society of Mechanical Engineers (ASME), the specific ratio – the ratio of the discharge pressure over the suction pressure – is used for defining fans, blowers and compressors. Fans have a specific ratio of up to 1.11, blowers from 1.11 to 1.20 and compressors have more than 1.20. Typically due to the higher pressure rise involved blowers and compressors have sturdier builds than fans.

Table 1: Differences between fans and blowers
Equipment	Pressure Ratio	Pressure rise (mm H_{2}O)
Fans	Up to 1.1	Up to 1136
Blowers	1.1 to 1.2	1136-2066
Compressors	Over 1.2	Over 2066

=== Velocity triangle ===
Blade velocity components, each with mean velocity and direction, vary at different points on the blade due to changes in the direction of flow. Hence an infinite number of velocity triangles are possible for a given blade. To simplify the number of velocity components while exploring flow geometry, velocity triangle diagrams are typically only calculated at the entry and exit of a blade. A velocity triangle consists of three velocity components:

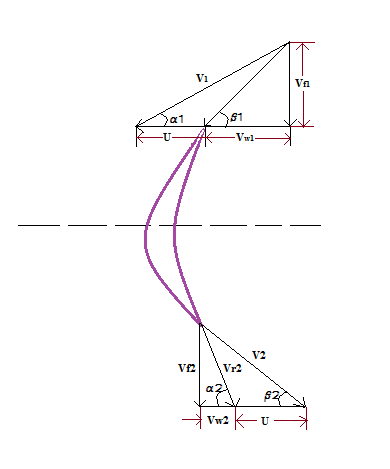
Velocity triangle for forward-facing blade

- U Blade velocity
- V_{r} Relative Velocity
- V Absolute velocity

These velocities are related by the triangle law of vector addition:

$$V = U + V_r$$

This relatively simple equation is used frequently while drawing the velocity diagram. The velocity diagram for the forward, backward face blades shown are drawn using this law. The angle α is the angle made by the absolute velocity with the axial direction and angle β is the angle made by blade with respect to axial direction.

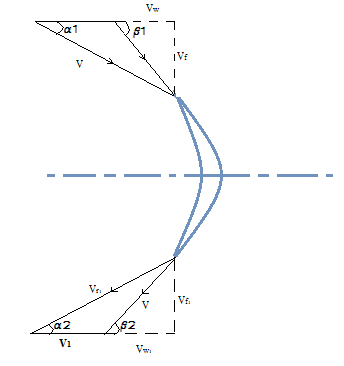
Velocity triangle for backward-facing blade

== Ratings ==
Ratings found in centrifugal fan performance tables and curves are based on standard air SCFM; clean, dry air with a density of 0.075 pounds mass per cubic foot (1.2 kg/m^{3}), barometric pressure at sea level of 29.92 inches of mercury (101.325 kPa) and a temperature of 70 °F (21 °C). Selecting a centrifugal fan to operate at conditions other than standard air requires adjustment to both static pressure and power as constant volume of air is displaced regardless of air density.

At higher-than-standard elevation (sea level) and/or higher-than-standard temperature (21 °C) air density is lower, as such air density corrections must be made to account for the fact that centrifugal fans displace a constant volume of air in a given system regardless of air mass.

When a centrifugal fan is specified for a given CFM and static pressure at conditions other than standard, an air density correction factor must be applied to select the proper size fan to meet the new condition. Since 200 °F (93 °C) air weighs only 80% of 70 °F (21 °C) air, the centrifugal fan creates less pressure and requires less power. To get the actual pressure required at 200 °F (93 °C), the designer must multiply the pressure at standard conditions by an air density correction factor of 1.25 (i.e., 1.0/0.8) to get the system to operate correctly. To get the actual power at 200 °F (93 °C), the designer must divide the power at standard conditions by the air density correction factor.

=== Air Movement and Control Association (AMCA) ===
The centrifugal fan performance tables provide the fan RPM and power requirements at a given voltage for the given CFM and static pressure at standard air density. When the centrifugal fan performance is not at standard conditions, the performance must be converted to standard conditions before entering the performance tables. Centrifugal fans rated by the Air Movement and Control Association (AMCA) are tested in laboratories with test setups that simulate installations that are typical for that type of fan. Usually they are tested and rated as one of four standard installation types as designated in AMCA Standard 210.

AMCA Standard 210 defines uniform methods for conducting laboratory tests on housed fans to determine airflow rate, pressure, power and efficiency, at a given speed of rotation. The purpose of AMCA Standard 210 is to define exact procedures and conditions of fan testing so that ratings provided by various manufacturers are on the same basis and may be compared. For this reason, fans must be rated in standardized SCFM.

=== Centrifugal fan (Fan Wheel + Motor + Housing) Performance table ===
Centrifugal fan performance curves to ISO 12759 may be also provided for a blower. using various orifice plates to gather each data point.

To avoid extensive analysis of performance curves and tables by the HVAC system designer, the fan energy index (FEI) has been to developed to ensure that centrifugal fans can be compared at a certain design duty point (Airflow and Static Pressure). Anything above 1 would be considered more efficient than the baseline, while anything below would be less. FEI is intended as a simple tool to allow an optimal range of speeds while avoiding excessive vibration in the region of instability (speed too slow) and fan stall (rapid static pressure decline).

Centrifugal fan (motor + fan wheel + housing) performance tables at a given voltage and fan speed can be provided by centrifugal fan suppliers for use by a system designer to determine the expected outlet airflow at a given static pressure created by the HVAC components (filters + filter covers + ducts + registers). Rating tables may be provided at multiple speeds(high, medium, low) and/or voltages(12,13,24VDC). As noted in the theoretical table below, designing the HVAC system centrifugal fan to move the most volume of airflow across the HVAC heat exchangers to improve heat transfer rate and overall system performance can only be achieved by minimizing static pressure created by the HVAC components: air filters (keeping them unclogged), filter covers, ducting, and registers (ensuring laminar flow and no restrictions).

Table 2: Theoretical Centrifugal Fan Curve Data
Static Pressure(Pa)	Airflow(CMH)	Current(A)	Rpm	Case Temperature(C)
1	900	24	2,800	21
50	850	23.6	2,850	21
100	800	23	2,900	21
150	750	22.5	2,950	21

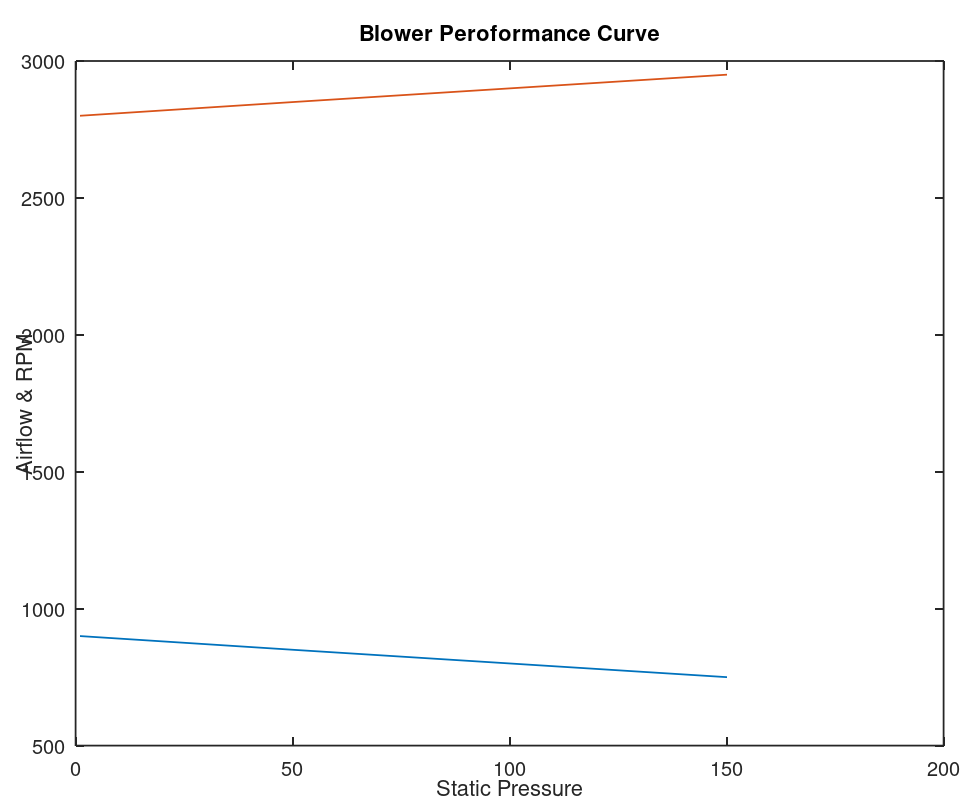

== Losses ==
Centrifugal fans suffer efficiency losses in both stationary and moving parts, increasing the energy input required for a given level of airflow performance.

=== Impeller entry ===
Flow at the intake and its turning from axial to radial direction causes losses at the intake. Friction and flow separation cause impeller blade losses since there is change in incidence angle. These impeller blade losses are also included in the category.

=== Leakage ===
Leakage of some air and disturbance in the main flow field is caused due to the clearance provided between the rotating periphery of the impeller and the casing at the entry.

=== Diffuser and volute ===
Friction and flow separation also causes losses in the diffuser. Further losses due to incidence occur if the device is working beyond its design conditions. Flow from the impeller or diffuser expands in the volute, which has a larger cross section leading to the formation of eddy, which in turn reduces pressure head. Friction and flow separation losses also occur due to the volute passage.

=== Disc friction ===
Viscous drag on the back surface of the impeller disc causes disc friction losses.

== In literature ==
In Walter Miller's science-fiction novel A Canticle for Leibowitz (1959), an order of monks in a post-apocalyptic 26th century safeguard an electrical blueprint for a "squirrel cage" as a holy relic, though puzzled over how to reveal the "squirrel".

== See also ==
- Axial fan – Machine used to produce air flow
- Ducted fan – Air moving arrangement
- Mechanical fan – Machine used to produce air flow
- Standard temperature and pressure – Reference values for temperature and pressure
- Three-dimensional losses and correlation in turbomachinery
- Waddle fan – Large centrifugal fans, used to ventilate coal mines
- Wind turbine – Device to generate electricity from wind
