= Isentropic nozzle flow =

Fluid flow through a narrow opening with no change in entropy

In fluid mechanics, isentropic nozzle flow describes the movement of a fluid through a narrow opening without an increase in entropy (an isentropic process).

== Overview ==
Whenever a gas is forced through a tube, the gaseous molecules are deflected by the tube's walls. If the speed of the gas is much less than the speed of sound, the gas density will remain constant and the velocity of the flow will increase. However, as the speed of the flow approaches the speed of sound, compressibility effects on the gas are to be considered. The density of the gas becomes position dependent. While considering flow through a tube, if the flow is very gradually compressed (i.e. area decreases) and then gradually expanded (i.e. area increases), the flow conditions are restored (i.e. return to its initial position). So, such a process is a reversible process. According to the second law of thermodynamics, whenever there is a reversible and adiabatic flow, constant value of entropy is maintained. Engineers classify this type of flow as an isentropic flow of fluids. Isentropic is the combination of the Greek word "iso" (which means - same) and entropy.

When the change in flow variables is small and gradual, isentropic flows occur. The generation of sound waves is an isentropic process. A supersonic flow that is turned while there is an increase in flow area is also isentropic. Since there is an increase in area, therefore we call this an isentropic expansion. If a supersonic flow is turned abruptly and the flow area decreases, the flow is irreversible due to the generation of shock waves. The isentropic relations are no longer valid and the flow is governed by the oblique or normal shock relations.

== Set of equations ==
Below are nine equations commonly used when evaluating isentropic flow conditions. These assume the gas is calorically perfect; i.e. the ratio of specific heats is a constant across the temperature range. In typical cases the actual variation is only slight.

1. $M = \frac{v}{c_s}$
2. $c_s = \sqrt\frac{\gamma p}{\rho} = \sqrt{ \gamma R T }$
3. $\frac{p}{\rho^\gamma} = \frac{p_t}{\rho_t^\gamma}$
4. $\frac{p}{p_t} = \left( \frac{\rho}{\rho_t} \right) ^ \gamma = \left(\frac{T}{T_t}\right)^\frac{\gamma}{\gamma-1}$
5. $q = \frac{1}{2} \rho v^2 = \frac{1}{2} \gamma p M^2$
6. $\frac{p}{p_t} = \left(1+\frac{\gamma-1}{2} M^2 \right) ^ \frac{-\gamma}{\gamma-1}$
7. $\frac{T}{T_t} = \left(1+\frac{\gamma-1}{2} M^2 \right) ^ {-1}$
8. $\frac{\rho}{\rho_t} = \left(1+\frac{\gamma-1}{2} M^2 \right) ^ \frac{-1}{\gamma-1}$
9. $\frac{A}{A^{*}} = \frac{1}{M} \left(\frac{\gamma+1}{2}\right) ^ \frac{-(\gamma+1)}{2(\gamma-1)} \left(1+\frac{\gamma-1}{2} M^2 \right) ^ \frac{\gamma+1}{2\left(\gamma-1\right)}$
- Properties without a subscript are evaluated at the point of interest (this point may be chosen anywhere along the length of the nozzle, but once chosen, all properties in a calculation must be evaluated at the same point)
- Subscript $t$ denotes a property at total/stagnation conditions. In a rocket or jet engine, this means the conditions inside the combustion chamber. For example, $p_t$ is total pressure/stagnation pressure/chamber pressure (all equivalent).
- $M$ is the local Mach number of the gas.
- $v$ is the speed of the gas (m/s).
- $c_s$ is the local speed of sound through the gas (m/s).
- $\gamma$ is the ratio of specific heats of the gas.
- $p$ is the pressure of the gas (Pa).
- $\rho$ is the density of the gas (kg/m^{3}).
- $T$ is the temperature of the gas (K).
- $A$ is the cross sectional area of the nozzle at the point of interest (m^{2}).
- $A^*$ is the cross sectional area of the nozzle at the sonic point, or the point where gas velocity is Mach 1 (m^{2}). Ideally, this will occur at the nozzle throat.

== Stagnation properties ==
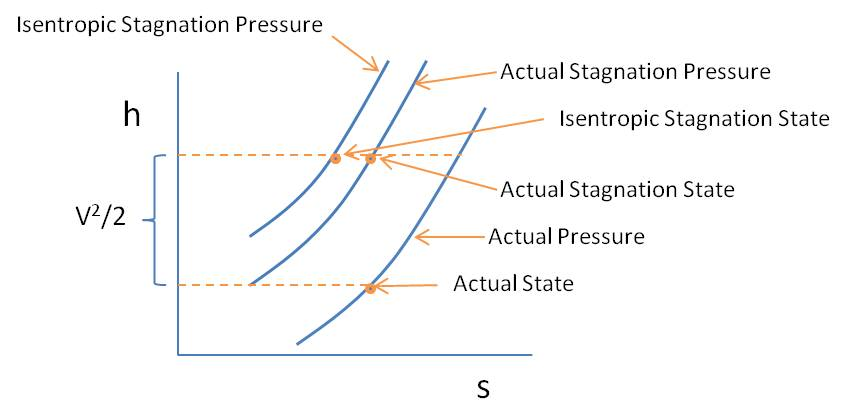
Enthalpy-entropy diagram of stagnation state

In fluid dynamics, a stagnation point is a point in a flow field where the local velocity of the fluid is zero. The isentropic stagnation state is the state a flowing fluid would attain if it underwent a reversible adiabatic deceleration to zero velocity. There are both actual and the isentropic stagnation states for a typical gas or vapor. Sometimes it is advantageous to make a distinction between the actual and the isentropic stagnation states. The actual stagnation state is the state achieved after an actual deceleration to zero velocity (as at the nose of a body placed in a fluid stream), and there may be irreversibility associated with the deceleration process.

Therefore, the term "stagnation property" is sometimes reserved for the properties associated with the actual state, and the term total property is used for the isentropic stagnation state. The enthalpy is the same for both the actual and isentropic stagnation states (assuming that the actual process is adiabatic). Therefore, for an ideal gas, the actual stagnation temperature is the same as the isentropic stagnation temperature. However, the actual stagnation pressure may be less than the isentropic stagnation pressure. For this reason the term "total pressure" (meaning isentropic stagnation pressure) has particular meaning compared to the actual stagnation pressure.

== Flow analysis ==
The isentropic efficiency is $\frac{h_1-h_{2a}}{h_1-h_2}$.

The variation of fluid density for compressible flows requires attention to density and other fluid property relationships. The fluid equation of state, often unimportant for incompressible flows, is vital in the analysis of compressible flows. Also, temperature variations for compressible flows are usually significant and thus the energy equation is important. Curious phenomena can occur with compressible flows.

- For simplicity, the gas is assumed to be an ideal gas.
- The gas flow is isentropic.
- The gas flow is constant.
- The gas flow is along a straight line from gas inlet to exhaust gas exit.
- The gas flow behavior is compressible.

There are numerous applications where a steady, uniform, isentropic flow is a good approximation to the flow in conduits. These include the flow through a jet engine, through the nozzle of a rocket, from a broken gas line, and past the blades of a turbine.

M = Mach number
V = velocity
R = universal gas constant
p = pressure
k = specific heat ratio
T = temperature
* = sonic conditions
ρ = density
A = area
M_{m} = molar mass

Energy equation for the steady flow:
$$q_{net} + h + \frac{V^2}{2} = w_{net} + h_0 + \frac{V_0^2}{2}$$

To model such situations, consider the control volume in the changing area of the conduit of Fig. The continuity equation between two sections an infinitesimal distance dx apart is
$$\rho AV = (\rho + d\rho)(A+dA)(V +dV)$$

If only the first-order terms in a differential quantity are retained, continuity takes the form
$$\frac{dV}{V} + \frac{dA}{A} + \frac{d\rho}{\rho} = 0$$

The energy equation is:
$$\frac{V^2}{2} + \frac{k}{k-1}\cdot\frac{p}{\rho} = \frac{\left(V+dV\right)^2}{2} + \frac{k}{k-1}\cdot\frac{p+dp}{\rho + d\rho}$$

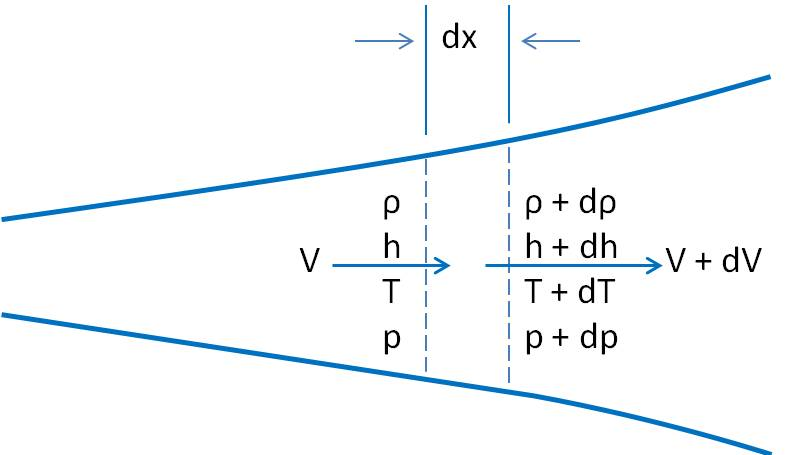
Steady, uniform, isentropic flow through a conduit

This simplifies to, neglecting higher-order terms:
$$VdV + \frac{k}{k-1}\cdot\frac{\rho dp - pd\rho}{\rho^2} = 0$$
Assuming an isentropic flow, the energy equation becomes:
$$VdV + \frac{k\cdot p}{\rho^2}\cdot d\rho = 0$$
Substitute from the continuity equation to obtain
$$\frac{dV}{V}\cdot \left(\frac{\rho V^2}{k p} - 1\right) = \frac{dA}{A}$$
or, in terms of the Mach number:
$$\frac{dV}{V}\cdot \left(M^2-1\right) = \frac{dA}{A}$$

This equation applies to a steady, uniform, isentropic flow. There are several observations that can be made from an analysis of Eq. (9.26). They are:

- For a subsonic flow in an expanding conduit (M < 1 and dA > 0), the flow is decelerating (dV < 0).
- For a subsonic flow in a converging conduit (M < 1 and dA < 0), the flow is accelerating (dV > 0).
- For a supersonic flow in an expanding conduit (M > 1 and dA > 0), the flow is accelerating (dV > 0).
- For a supersonic flow in a converging conduit (M > 1 and dA < 0), the flow is decelerating (dV < 0).
- At a throat where dA = 0, either M = 1 or dV = 0 (the flow could be accelerating through M = 1, or it may reach a velocity such that dV = 0).

=== Supersonic flow ===
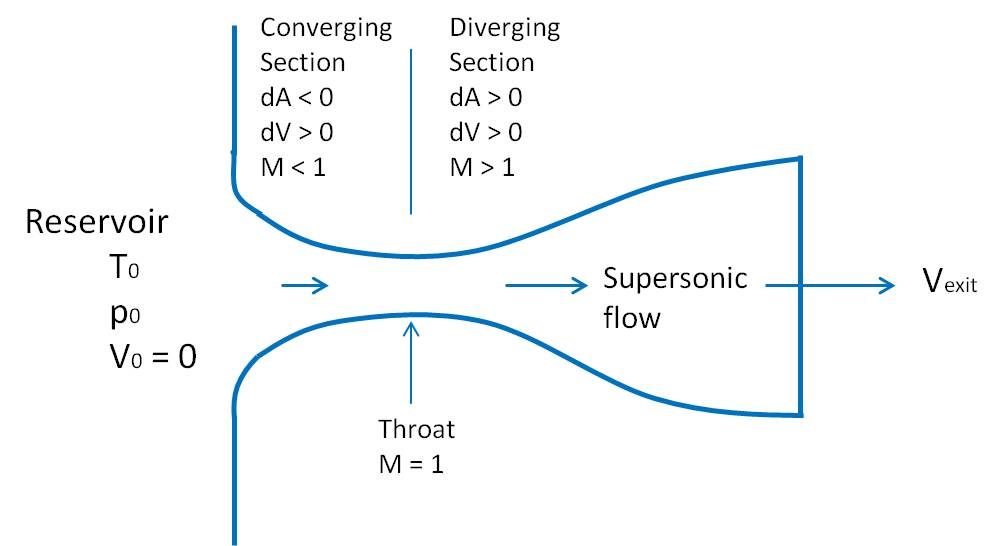
Fig: A supersonic nozzle

A nozzle for a supersonic flow must increase in area in the flow direction, and a diffuser must decrease in area, opposite to a nozzle and diffuser for a subsonic flow. So, for a supersonic flow to develop from a reservoir where the velocity is zero, the subsonic flow must first accelerate through a converging area to a throat, followed by continued acceleration through an enlarging area.

The nozzles on a rocket designed to place satellites in orbit are constructed using such converging-diverging geometry. The energy and continuity equations can take on particularly helpful forms for the steady, uniform, isentropic flow through the nozzle. Apply the energy equation with Q, W_{S} = 0 between the reservoir and some location in the nozzle to obtain
$$c_p\cdot T_0 = \frac{V^2}{2} + c_p\cdot T$$

Any quantity with a zero subscript refers to a stagnation point where the velocity is zero, such as in the reservoir. Using several thermodynamic relations, equations can be put in the forms:

$$\begin{align}
\frac{T_0}{T} &= 1 + \frac{k-1}{2}M^2 \\
\frac{p_0}{p} &= \left(1+\frac{k-1}{2}M^2 \right)^\frac{k}{k-1} \\
\frac{\rho_0}{\rho} &= \left(1+\frac{k-1}{2}M^2 \right)^\frac{1}{k-1}
\end{align}$$

If the above equations are applied at the throat (the critical area signified by an asterisk (*) superscript, where M = 1), the energy equation takes the forms

$$\begin{align}
\frac{T^*}{T_0} &= \frac{2}{k+1} \\
\frac{p^*}{p_0} &= \left(\frac{2}{k+1}\right)^\frac{k}{k-1} \\
\frac{\rho^*}{\rho_0} &= \left(\frac{2}{k+1}\right)^\frac{1}{k-1}
\end{align}$$

The critical area is often referenced even though a throat does not exist. For air with k = 1.4, the equations above provide
$$\begin{align}
T^* &= 0.833333 \cdot T_0 \\
p^* &= 0.528282 \cdot p_0 \\
\rho^* &= 0.633938 \cdot \rho_0
\end{align}$$

The mass flux through the nozzle is of interest and is given by:
$$\dot{m}= \rho AV = \frac{p}{RT}\cdot A\cdot M \sqrt{k R_{specific} T} = p \sqrt{k M_m \over RT} AM$$

With the use of Eq. (9.28), the mass flux, after applying some algebra, can be expressed as
$$\dot{m}=p_0 MA \sqrt{\frac{k M_m}{RT_0}} \left(1+\frac{k-1}{2}M^2\right)^\frac{k+1}{-2(k-1)}$$

If the critical area is selected where M = 1, this takes the form
$$\dot{m}= p_0 A^* \sqrt{\frac{k M_m}{RT_0}} \left(1+\frac{k-1}{2}\right)^{\frac{k+1}{-2(k-1)}}$$
which, when combined with previous it provides:
$$\frac{A}{A^*} = \frac{1}{M} \left(\frac{k+1}{2+(k-1)\cdot M^2}\right)^{\frac{k+1}{-2(k-1)}}$$

==== Converging nozzle ====
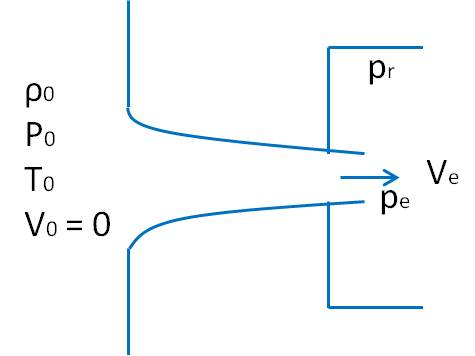
Figure 1: A converging nozzle

Consider a converging nozzle connecting a reservoir with a receiver. If the reservoir pressure is held constant and the receiver pressure reduced, the Mach number at the exit of the nozzle will increase until M_{e} = 1 is reached, indicated by the left curve in figure 2. After M_{e} = 1 is reached at the nozzle exit for p_{r} = 0.5283p_{0}, the condition of choked flow occurs and the velocity throughout the nozzle cannot change with further decreases in p_{r}. This is due to the fact that pressure changes downstream of the exit cannot travel upstream to cause changes in the flow conditions.

The right curve of figure 2. represents the case when the reservoir pressure is increased and the receiver pressure is held constant. When M_{e} = 1, the condition of choked flow also occurs; but Eq indicates that the mass flux will continue to increase as p_{0} is increased. This is the case when a gas line ruptures.

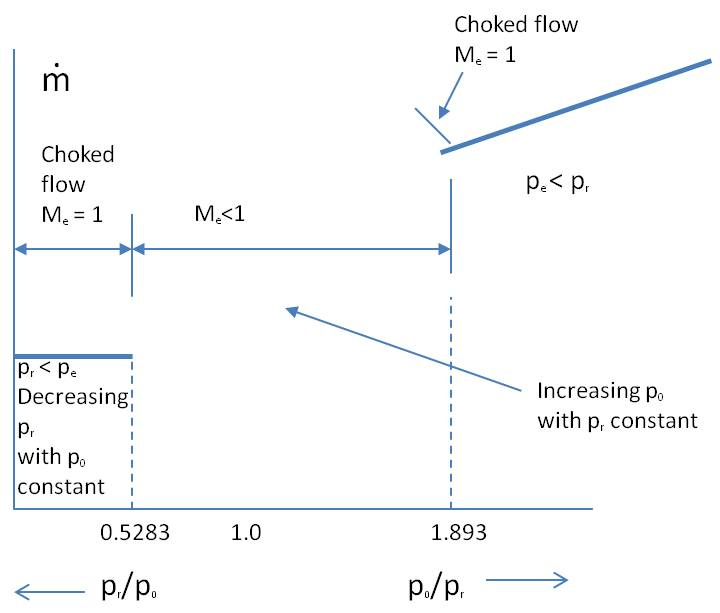
Figure 2: The pressure variation in the nozzle

It is interesting that the exit pressure p_{e} is able to be greater than the receiver pressure p_{r}. Nature allows this by providing the streamlines of a gas the ability to make a sudden change of direction at the exit and expand to a much greater area resulting in a reduction of the pressure from p_{e} to p_{r}. The case of a converging-diverging nozzle allows a supersonic flow to occur, providing the receiver pressure is sufficiently low. This is shown in figure 3 assuming a constant reservoir pressure with a decreasing receiver pressure. If the receiver pressure is equal to the reservoir pressure, no flow occurs, represented by curve A. If p_{r} is slightly less than p_{0}, the flow is subsonic throughout, with a minimum pressure at the throat, represented by curve B. As the pressure is reduced still further, a pressure is reached that result in M = 1 at the throat with subsonic flow throughout the remainder of the nozzle.

There is another receiver pressure substantially below that of curve C that also results in isentropic flow throughout the nozzle, represented by curve D; after the throat the flow is supersonic. Pressures in the receiver in between those of curve C and curve D result in non-isentropic flow (a shock wave occurs in the flow). If p_{r} is below that of curve D, the exit pressure p_{e} is greater than p_{r}. Once again, for receiver pressures below that of curve C, the mass flux remains constant since the conditions at the throat remain unchanged. It may appear that the supersonic flow will tend to separate from the nozzle, but just the opposite is true. A supersonic flow can turn very sharp angles, since nature provides expansion fans that do not exist in subsonic flows. To avoid separation in subsonic nozzles, the expansion angle should not exceed 10°. For larger angles, vanes are used so that the angle between the vanes does not exceed 10°.

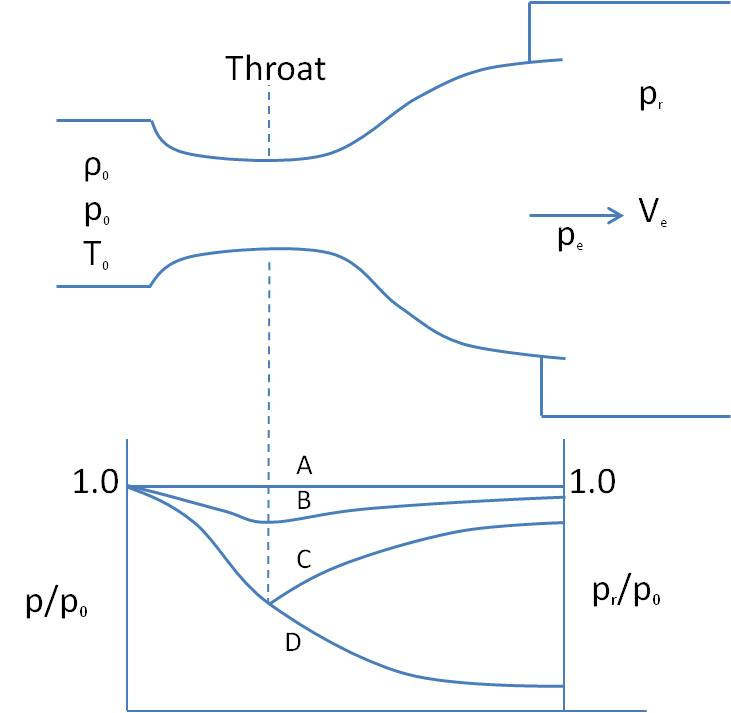
Figure 3: A converging-diverging nozzle with reservoir pressure fixed

== See also ==
- Compressible flow
- de Laval nozzle
- Fanno flow
- Supersonic gas separation
