= Mass injection flow =

Mass injection flow (a.k.a. Limbach Flow) refers to inviscid, adiabatic flow through a constant area duct where the effect of mass addition is considered. For this model, the duct area remains constant, the flow is assumed to be steady and one-dimensional, and mass is added within the duct. Because the flow is adiabatic, unlike in Rayleigh flow, the stagnation temperature is a constant. Compressibility effects often come into consideration, though this flow model also applies to incompressible flow.

For supersonic flow (an upstream Mach number greater than 1), deceleration occurs with mass addition to the duct and the flow can become choked. Conversely, for subsonic flow (an upstream Mach number less than 1), acceleration occurs and the flow can become choked given sufficient mass addition. Therefore, mass addition will cause both supersonic and subsonic Mach numbers to approach Mach 1, resulting in choked flow.

== Theory ==
The 1D mass injection flow model begins with a mass-velocity relation derived for mass injection into a steady, adiabatic, frictionless, constant area flow of calorically perfect gas:

$\ \frac{dm}{m}=-\frac{du}{u}\left(M^2-1\right)$

where $m$ represents a mass flux, $m=\dot{m}/A$. This expression describes how velocity will change with a change in mass flux (i.e. how a change in mass flux $dm$ drives a change in velocity $du$). From this relation, two distinct modes of behavior are seen:

1. When flow is subsonic ($M<1$) the quantity $[M^2 - 1]$ is negative, so the right-hand side of the equation becomes positive. This indicates that increasing mass flux will increase subsonic flow velocity toward Mach 1.
2. When flow is supersonic ($M>1$) the quantity $[M^2 - 1]$ is positive, so the right-hand side of the equation becomes negative. This indicates that increasing mass flux will decrease supersonic flow velocity towards Mach 1.

From the mass-velocity relation, an explicit mass-Mach relation may be derived:

$\frac{dm}{m} = \frac{1-M^2}{M+\frac{1}{2}M^3(\gamma - 1)}dM$

== Derivations ==
Although Fanno flow and Rayleigh flow are covered in detail in many textbooks, mass injection flow is not. For this reason, derivations of fundamental mass flow properties are given here. In the following derivations, the constant $R$ is used to denote the specific gas constant (i.e. $R=\bar{R}/M$).

=== Mass-Velocity Relation ===
We begin by establishing a relationship between the differential enthalpy, pressure, and density of a calorically perfect gas:

$$\begin{align} h &= c_p T\\ h &= c_p \left(\frac{pv}{R} \right)\\ dh &= \frac{c_p}{R} d(pdv+vdp)\\ \frac{dh}{h} &= \left(\frac{\cancel{R}}{\cancel{c_p} pv}\right) \cancel{\frac{c_p}{R}} (pdv+vdp)\\ \frac{dh}{h} &= \frac{dp}{p}+\frac{dv}{v}\\ \frac{dh}{h} &= \frac{dp}{p}-\frac{d\rho}{\rho}\\ \end{align}$$	1

From the adiabatic energy equation ($dh_0=0$) we find:

$$\begin{align} h+\frac{u^2}{2} &= h_0\\ dh+\frac{1}{2}d(uu) &= \cancel{dh_0}\\ dh+\frac{1}{2}(udu+udu) &= 0\\ dh+udu &= 0\\ \frac{dh}{h}+\frac{udu}{h} &= 0 \end{align}$$	2

Substituting the enthalpy-pressure-density relation (1) into the adiabatic energy relation (2) yields

$$\begin{align} \frac{dp}{p} - \frac{d\rho}{\rho} + \frac{udu}{h} &= 0 \end{align}$$	3

Next, we find a relationship between differential density, mass flux ($m=\dot{m}/A$), and velocity:

$$\begin{align} \dot{m} &= \rho u A\\ m &= \rho u\\ \rho &= \frac{m}{u}\\ d\rho &= \frac{udm-mdu}{u^2}\\ \frac{d\rho}{\rho} &= \frac{dm}{m} - \frac{du}{u} \end{align}$$	4

Substituting the density-mass-velocity relation (4) into the modified energy relation (3) yields

$$\begin{align} \frac{dp}{p} - \frac{dm}{m} + \frac{du}{u} + \frac{udu}{h} &= 0 \end{align}$$	5

Substituting the 1D steady flow momentum conservation equation (see also the Euler equations) of the form $dp=-\rho udu$ into (5) yields

$$\begin{align} 0 &= \frac{-\rho udu}{p} - \frac{dm}{m} + \frac{du}{u} + \frac{udu}{h}\\ \frac{dm}{m} &= \frac{-\rho udu}{p} + \frac{du}{u} + \frac{udu}{h}\\ &= \frac{du}{u}\left(\frac{-\rho u^2}{p} + \frac{u^2}{h} + 1\right)\\ \frac{dm}{m} &= \frac{du}{u}\left[\left(\frac{1}{h}-\frac{\rho}{p}\right) u^2 +1\right] \end{align}$$	6

From the ideal gas law we find,

$\frac{\rho}{p}=\frac{1}{RT}$	7

and from the definition of a calorically perfect gas we find,

$h=c_p T=\left(\frac{\gamma R}{\gamma-1}\right)T$	8

Substituting expressions (7) and (8) into the combined equation (6) yields

$$\begin{align} \frac{dm}{m} &= \frac{du}{u}\left[\left(\frac{\gamma -1}{\gamma RT}-\frac{1}{RT}\right) u^2 +1\right]\\ \frac{dm}{m} &= \frac{du}{u}\left[\left(\frac{-1}{\gamma RT}\right) u^2 +1 \right] \end{align}$$	9

Using the speed of sound in an ideal gas ($a^2=\gamma RT$) and the definition of the Mach number ($M = u / a$) yields

$$\begin{align} \frac{dm}{m} &= \frac{du}{u}\left[\left(\frac{-u^2}{a^2}\right) +1 \right] \end{align}$$	10

Mass-Velocity Relation

$\frac{dm}{m} = -\frac{du}{u}[M^2 -1]$

This is the mass-velocity relationship for mass injection into a steady, adiabatic, frictionless, constant area flow of calorically perfect gas.

=== Mass-Mach Relation ===
To find a relationship between differential mass and Mach number, we will find an expression for $du/u$ solely in terms of the Mach number, $M$. We can then substitute this expression into the mass-velocity relation to yield a mass-Mach relation. We begin by relating differential velocity, mach number, and speed of sound:

$$\begin{align} u &= Ma\\ du &= a dM + Mda \end{align}$$	11

We can now re-express $da$ in terms of $dT$:

$$\begin{align} a &= (\gamma RT)^{1/2}\\ da &= \frac{1}{2}(\gamma RT)^{-1/2}\cdot \gamma R dT\\ da &= \frac{\gamma R}{2 a} dT \end{align}$$	12

Substituting (12) into (11) yields,

$$\begin{align} du &= a dM + M\frac{\gamma R}{2 a} dT\\ \frac{du}{u} &= \frac{dM}{M} + \frac{\gamma R}{2 a^2} dT\\ &= \frac{dM}{M} + \frac{\cancel{\gamma R}}{2 \cancel{\gamma R} T} dT\\ \frac{du}{u} &= \frac{dM}{M} + \frac{1}{2} \frac{dT}{T} \end{align}$$	13

We can now re-express $dT$ in terms of $du$:

$$\begin{align} h_0 &= c_p T + \frac{1}{2} u^2\\ \cancel{dh_0} &= c_p dT + udu = 0\\ dT &= -udu \left( \frac{1}{c_p} \right)\\ \frac{dT}{T} &= \frac{-udu}{T} \left( \frac{\gamma - 1}{\gamma R} \right)\\ &= \frac{-udu}{a^2} (\gamma - 1)\\ &= \frac{-udu M^2}{u^2}(\gamma - 1)\\ \frac{dT}{T} &= -M^2(\gamma - 1)\frac{du}{u} \end{align}$$	14

By substituting (14) into (13), we can create an expression completely in terms of $du$ and $dM$. Performing this substitution and solving for $du/u$ yields,

$$\begin{align} \frac{du}{u} &= \frac{dM}{M} - \frac{M^2 (\gamma - 1)}{2} \frac{du}{u}\\ \frac{dM}{M} &= \frac{du}{u} \left( 1 + \frac{M^2 (\gamma - 1)}{2} \right) \\ \frac{du}{u} &= \frac{dM}{M} \left( 1+\frac{M^2 (\gamma - 1)}{2} \right) ^{-1} \end{align}$$	15

Finally, expression (15) for $du/u$ in terms of $dM$ may be substituted directly into the mass-velocity relation (10):

$$\begin{align} \frac{dm}{m} &= - \left[ \frac{dM}{M} \left( 1+\frac{M^2 (\gamma - 1)}{2} \right) ^{-1} \right] \cdot [M^2 -1] \end{align}$$	16

Mass-Mach Relation

$\frac{dm}{m} = \frac{1-M^2}{M+\frac{1}{2}M^3(\gamma - 1)}dM$

This is the mass-Mach relationship for mass injection into a steady, adiabatic, frictionless, constant area flow of calorically perfect gas.

== See also ==
- Fanno flow
- Rayleigh flow
- Compressible flow
- Choked flow
- Fanno flow
- Inviscid flow
- Adiabatic process
- Gas dynamics
