= Gas kinetics =

Study of the motion of gases

Gas kinetics is a science in the branch of fluid dynamics, concerned with the study of motion of gases and its effects on physical systems. Based on the principles of fluid mechanics and thermodynamics, gas dynamics arises from the studies of gas flows in transonic and supersonic flights. To distinguish itself from other sciences in fluid dynamics, the studies in gas dynamics are often defined with gases flowing around or within physical objects at speeds comparable to or exceeding the speed of sound and causing a significant change in temperature and pressure. Some examples of these studies include but are not limited to: choked flows in nozzles and valves, shock waves around jets, aerodynamic heating on atmospheric reentry vehicles and flows of gas fuel within a jet engine. At the molecular level, gas dynamics is a study of the kinetic theory of gases, often leading to the study of gas diffusion, statistical mechanics, chemical thermodynamics and non-equilibrium thermodynamics. Gas dynamics is synonymous with aerodynamics when the gas field is air and the subject of study is flight. It is highly relevant in the design of aircraft and spacecraft and their respective propulsion systems.

== History ==
Progress in gas dynamics coincides with the developments of transonic and supersonic flights. As aircraft began to travel faster, the density of air began to change, considerably increasing the air resistance as the air speed approached the speed of sound. The phenomenon was later identified in wind tunnel experiments as an effect caused by the formation of shock waves around the aircraft. Major advances were made to describe the behavior during and after World War II, and the new understandings on compressible and high speed flows became theories of gas dynamics.

As the construct that gases are small particles in Brownian motion became widely accepted and numerous quantitative studies verifying that the macroscopic properties of gases, such as temperature, pressure and density, are the results of collisions of moving particles, the study of kinetic theory of gases became increasingly an integrated part of gas dynamics. Modern books and classes on gas dynamics often began with an introduction to kinetic theory. The advent of the molecular modeling in computer simulation further made kinetic theory a highly relevant subject in today's research on gas dynamics.

== Introductory terminology ==
- Compressibility
- Mach number
- Diffusion

Gas dynamics is the overview of the average value in the distance between two molecules of gas that has collided without ignoring the structure in which the molecules are contained. The field requires a great amount of knowledge and practical use in the ideas of the kinetic theory of gases, and it links the kinetic theory of gases with the solid state physics through the study of how gas reacts with surfaces.

== Definition of a fluid ==
Fluids are substances that do not permanently change under an enormous amount of stress. A solid tends to deform in order to remain at equilibrium under a great deal of stress. Fluids are defined as both liquids and gases because the molecules inside the fluid are much weaker than those molecules contained in a solid. When referring to the density of a fluid in terms of a liquid, there is a small percentage of change to the liquid’s density as pressure is increased. If the fluid is referred to as a gas, the density will change greatly depending on the amount of pressure applied due to the equation of state for gases (p=ρRT). In the study of the flow of liquids, the term used while referring to the little change in density is called incompressible flow. In the study of the flow of gases, the rapid increase due to an increase of pressure is called compressible flow.

== Real gases ==
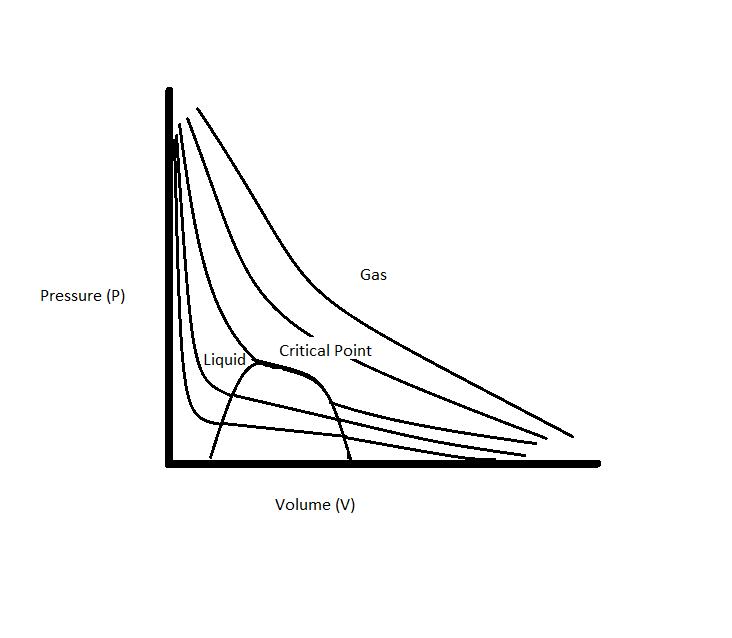
The critical point.

Real gases are characterized by their compressibility (z) in the equation PV = zn_{0}RT. When the pressure P is set as a function of the volume V where the series is determined by set temperatures T, P, and V began to take hyperbolic relationships that are exhibited by ideal gases as the temperatures start to get very high. A critical point is reached when the slope of the graph is equal to zero and makes the state of the fluid change between a liquid and a vapor. The properties of ideal gases contain viscosity, thermal conductivity, and diffusion.

=== Viscosity ===
The viscosity of gases is the result in the transfer of each molecule of gas as they pass each other from layer to layer. As gases tend to pass one another, the velocity, in the form of momentum, of the faster moving molecule speeds up the slower moving molecule. As the slower moving molecule passes the faster moving molecule, the momentum of the slower moving particle slows down the faster moving particle. The molecules continue to enact until frictional drag causes both molecules to equalize their velocities.

=== Thermal conductivity ===
The thermal conductivity of a gas can be found through analysis of a gas’ viscosity except the molecules are stationary while only the temperatures of the gases are changing. Thermal conductivity is stated as the amount of heat transported across a specific area in a specific time. The thermal conductivity always flows opposite of the direction of the temperature gradient.

=== Diffusion ===
Diffusion of gases is configured with a uniform concentration of gases and while the gases are stationary. Diffusion is the change of concentration between the two gases due to a weaker concentration gradient between the two gases. Diffusion is the transportation of mass over a period of time.

== Shock waves ==
The shock wave may be described as a compression front in a supersonic flow field, and the flow process across the front results in an abrupt change in fluid properties. The thickness of the shock wave is comparable to the mean free path of the gas molecules in the flow field. In other words, shock is a thin region where large gradients in temperature, pressure and velocity occur, and where the transport phenomena of momentum and energy are important. The normal shock wave is a compression front normal to the flow direction. However, in a wide variety of physical situations, a compression wave inclined at an angle to the flow occurs. Such a wave is called an oblique shock. Indeed, all naturally occurring shocks in external flows are oblique.

=== Stationary normal shock waves ===
A stationary normal shock wave is classified as going in the normal direction of the flow direction. For example, when a piston moves at a constant rate inside a tube, sound waves that travel down the tube are produced. As the piston continues to move, the wave begins to come together and compresses the gas inside the tube. The various calculations that come alongside of normal shock waves can vary due to the size of the tubes in which they are contained. Abnormalities such as converging-diverging nozzles and tubes with changing areas can affect such calculations as volume, pressure, and Mach number.

=== Moving normal shock waves ===
Unlike stationary normal shockwaves, moving normal shockwaves are more commonly available in physical situations. For example, a blunt object entering into the atmosphere faces a shock that comes through the medium of a non-moving gas. The fundamental problem that comes through moving normal shockwaves is the moment of a normal shockwave through motionless gas. The viewpoint of the moving shockwaves characterizes it as a moving or non-moving shock wave. The example of an object entering into the atmosphere depicts an object traveling in the opposite direction of the shockwave resulting in a moving shockwave, but if the object was launching into space, riding on top of the shockwave, it would appear to be a stationary shockwave. The relations and comparisons along with speed and shock ratios of moving and stationary shockwaves can be calculated through extensive formulas.

== Friction and compressible flow ==
Frictional forces play a role in determining the flow properties of compressible flow in ducts. In calculations, friction is either taken as inclusive or exclusive. If friction is inclusive, then the analysis of compressible flow becomes more complex as if friction is not inclusive. If the friction is exclusive to the analysis, then certain restrictions will be put into place. When friction is included on compressible flow, the friction limits the areas in which the results from analysis in be applied. As mentioned before, the shape of the duct, such as varying sizes or nozzles, effect the different calculations in between friction and compressible flow.

== See also ==
Important concepts

- Mach number
- Mach wave
- Normal shock
- Oblique shock
- Moving shock
- Prandtl–Meyer expansion fan

Visualisation methods

- Shadowgraph
- Schlieren photography
- Mach–Zehnder interferometer

Flows of interest

- Compressible flow
- Transonic flow
- Supersonic flow
- Hypersonic flow
- Choked flow
- De Laval nozzle
- Fanno flow
- Rayleigh flow

Computational techniques

- Riemann solver
- Smoothed particle hydrodynamics

Experimental techniques

- Shock tube
- Transonic, supersonic,
  hypersonic wind tunnels.
Aerodynamics
- Wave drag
- Sonic boom
- Whitcomb area rule
- Supercritical airfoil
- Supersonic transport
