= Afterburner =

Turbojet engine component

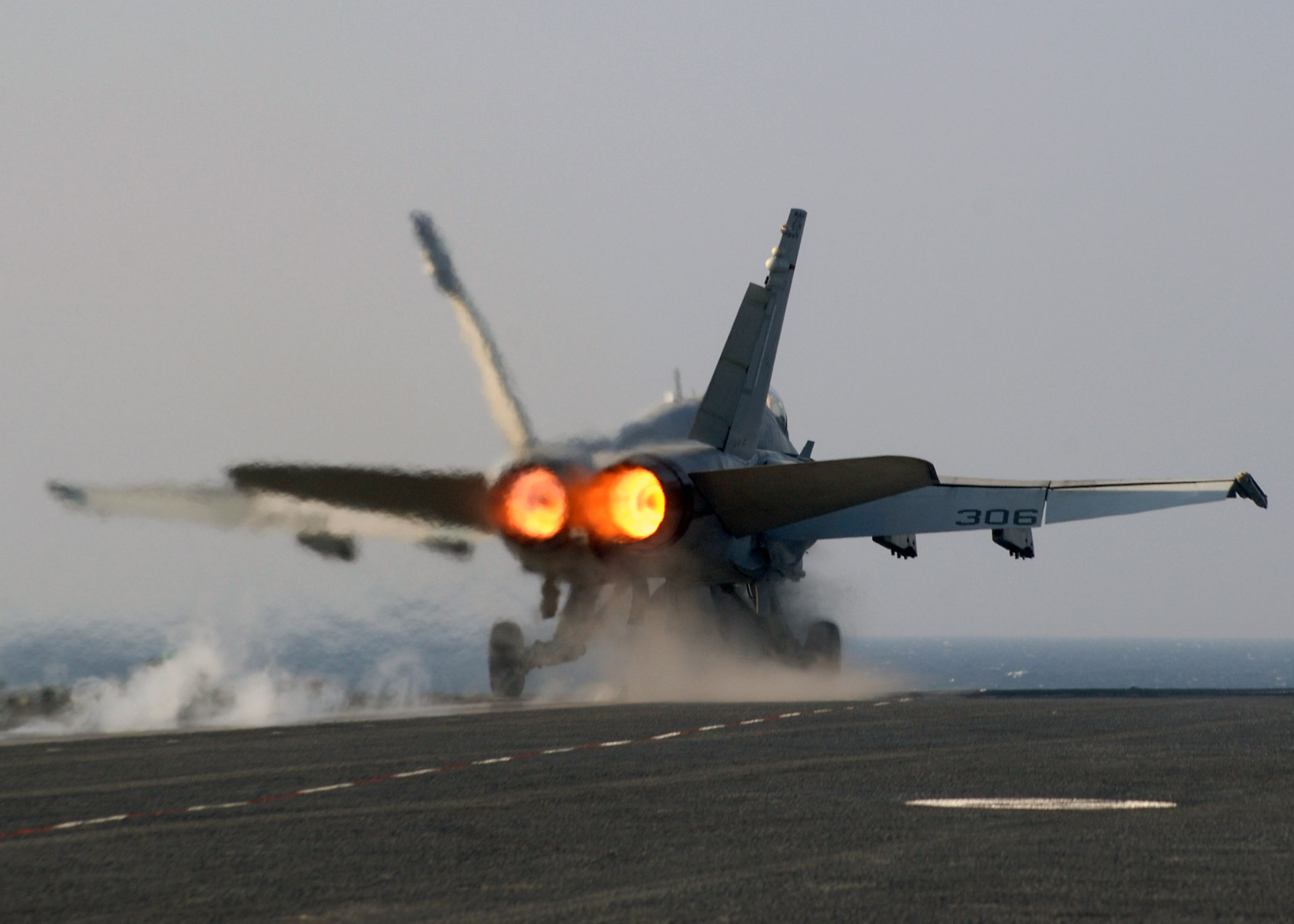
A US Navy F/A-18 Hornet being launched from the catapult at maximum power

An afterburner (or reheat in British English) is an additional combustion component used on some jet engines, mostly those on military supersonic aircraft. Its purpose is to increase thrust, usually for supersonic flight, takeoff, and combat. The afterburning process injects additional fuel into a combustor ("burner") in the jet pipe behind (i.e., "after") the turbine, "reheating" the exhaust gas. Afterburning significantly increases thrust and is used as an alternative to a larger, heavier engine. However, it increases fuel consumption and decreases fuel efficiency, which limits its use to short periods. This aircraft application of "reheat" contrasts with the meaning and implementation of "reheat" applicable to gas turbines driving electrical generators and which reduces fuel consumption.

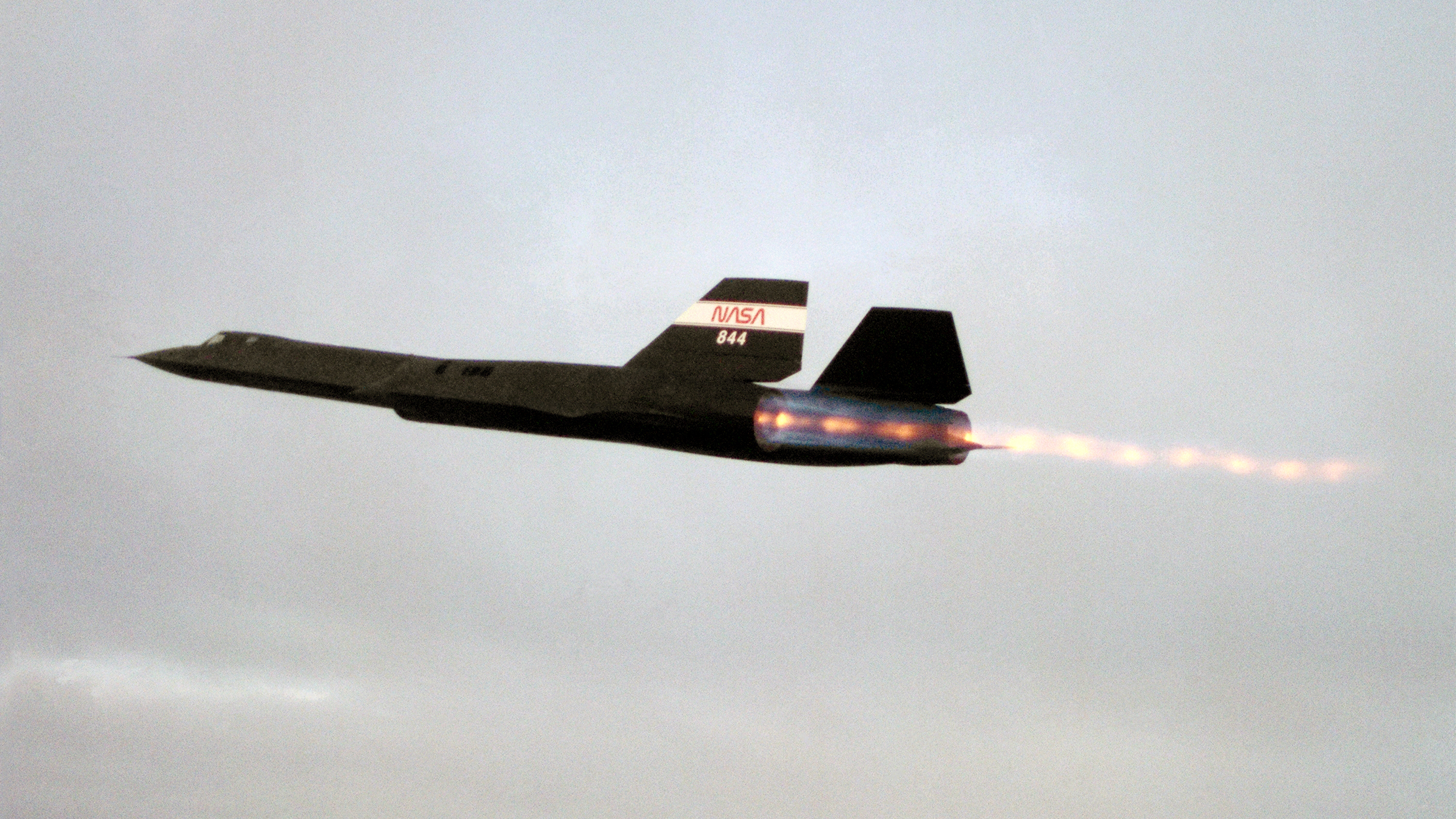
SR-71 Blackbird in flight with J58 engines at maximum power, with numerous shock diamonds visible in the exhaust

Jet engines are referred to as operating wet when afterburning and dry when not. An engine producing maximum thrust wet is at maximum power, while an engine producing maximum thrust dry is at military power.

== Principle ==
The first jet engine with after-burner was the E variant of the Jumo 004.

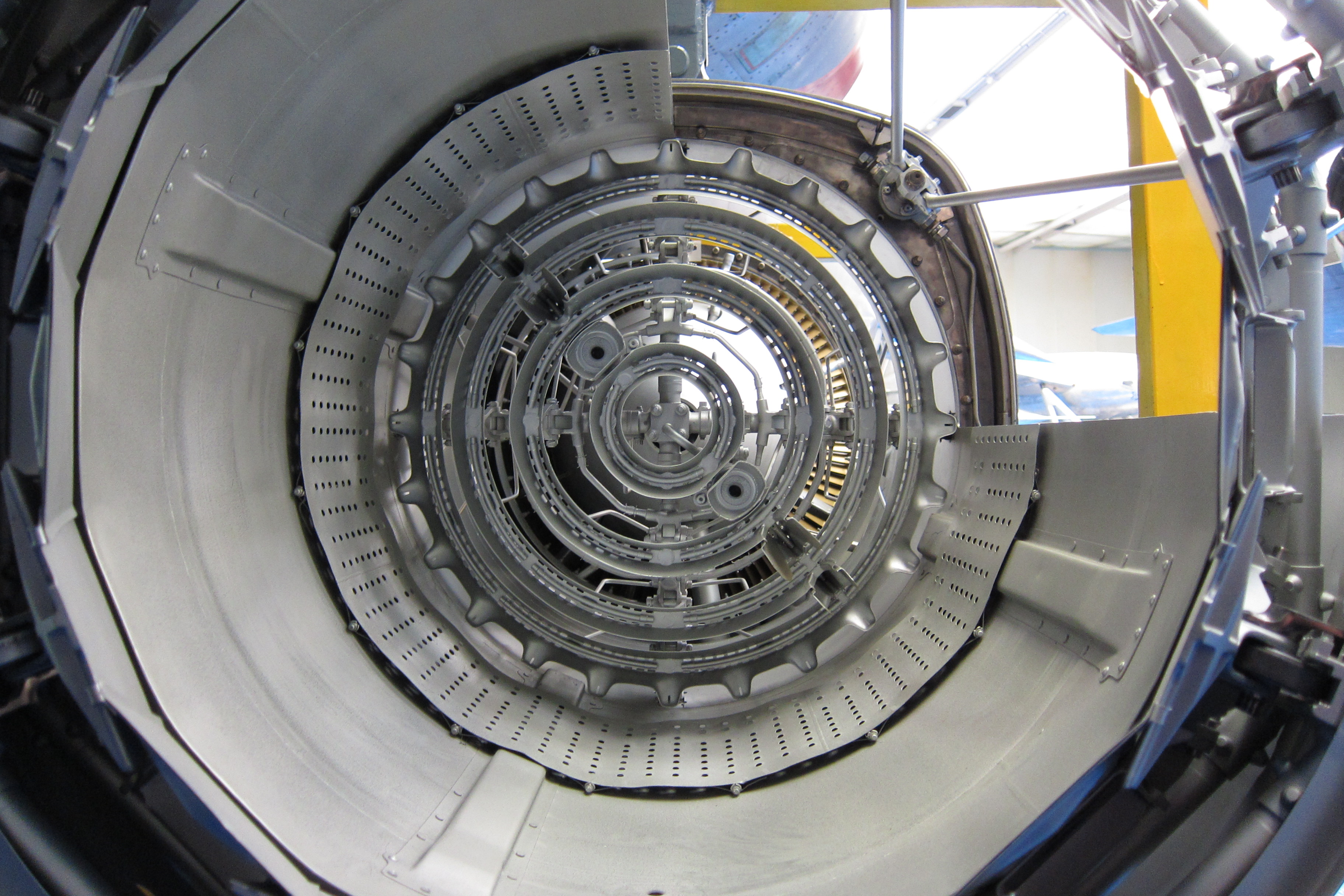
Rear part of a sectioned Rolls-Royce Turbomeca Adour. The afterburner with its four combustion rings is clearly seen at the center.

Jet-engine thrust is an application of Newton's reaction principle, in which the engine generates thrust because it increases the momentum of the air passing through it. Thrust depends on two things: the velocity of the exhaust gas and the mass of the gas exiting the nozzle. A jet engine can produce more thrust by either accelerating the gas to a higher velocity or ejecting a greater mass of gas from the engine. Designing a basic turbojet engine around the second principle produces the turbofan engine, which creates slower gas, but more of it. Turbofans are highly fuel efficient and can deliver high thrust for long periods of time, but the design tradeoff is a large size relative to the power output. Generating increased power with a more compact engine for short periods can be achieved using an afterburner. The afterburner increases thrust primarily by accelerating the exhaust gas to a higher velocity.

The following values and parameters are for an early jet engine, the Pratt & Whitney J57, stationary on the runway,and illustrate the high values of afterburner fuel flow, gas temperature and thrust compared to those for the engine operating within the temperature limitations for its turbine.

The highest temperature in the engine (about 3,700 °F (2,040 °C) occurs in the combustion chamber, where fuel is burned (at an approximate rate of 8,520 lb/h (3,860 kg/h)) in a relatively small proportion of the air entering the engine. The combustion products have to be diluted with air from the compressor to bring the gas temperature down to a specific value, known as the Turbine Entry Temperature (TET) (1,570 °F (850 °C)), which gives the turbine an acceptable life. Having to reduce the temperature of the combustion products by a large amount is one of the primary limitations on how much thrust can be generated (10,200 lb_{f} (45,000 N)). Burning all the oxygen delivered by the compressor stages would create temperatures (3,700 °F (2,040 °C)) high enough to significantly weaken the internal structure of the engine, but by mixing the combustion products with unburned air from the compressor at (600 °F (316 °C)) a substantial amount of oxygen (fuel/air ratio 0.014 compared to a no-oxygen-remaining value 0.0687) is still available for burning large quantities of fuel (25,000 lb/h (11,000 kg/h)) in an afterburner. The gas temperature decreases as it passes through the turbine (to 1,013 °F (545 °C)). The afterburner combustor reheats the gas, but to a much higher temperature (2,540 °F (1,390 °C)) than the TET (1,570 °F (850 °C)). As a result of the temperature rise in the afterburner combustor, the gas is accelerated, firstly by the heat addition, known as Rayleigh flow, then by the nozzle to a higher exit velocity than that which occurs without the afterburner. The mass flow is also slightly increased by the addition of the afterburner fuel. The thrust with afterburning is 16,000 lb_{f} (71,000 N).

The visible exhaust may show shock diamonds, which are caused by shock waves formed due to slight differences between ambient pressure and the exhaust pressure. This interaction causes oscillations in the exhaust jet diameter over a short distance and causes visible banding where pressure and temperature are highest.

== Thrust augmentation by heating bypass air ==
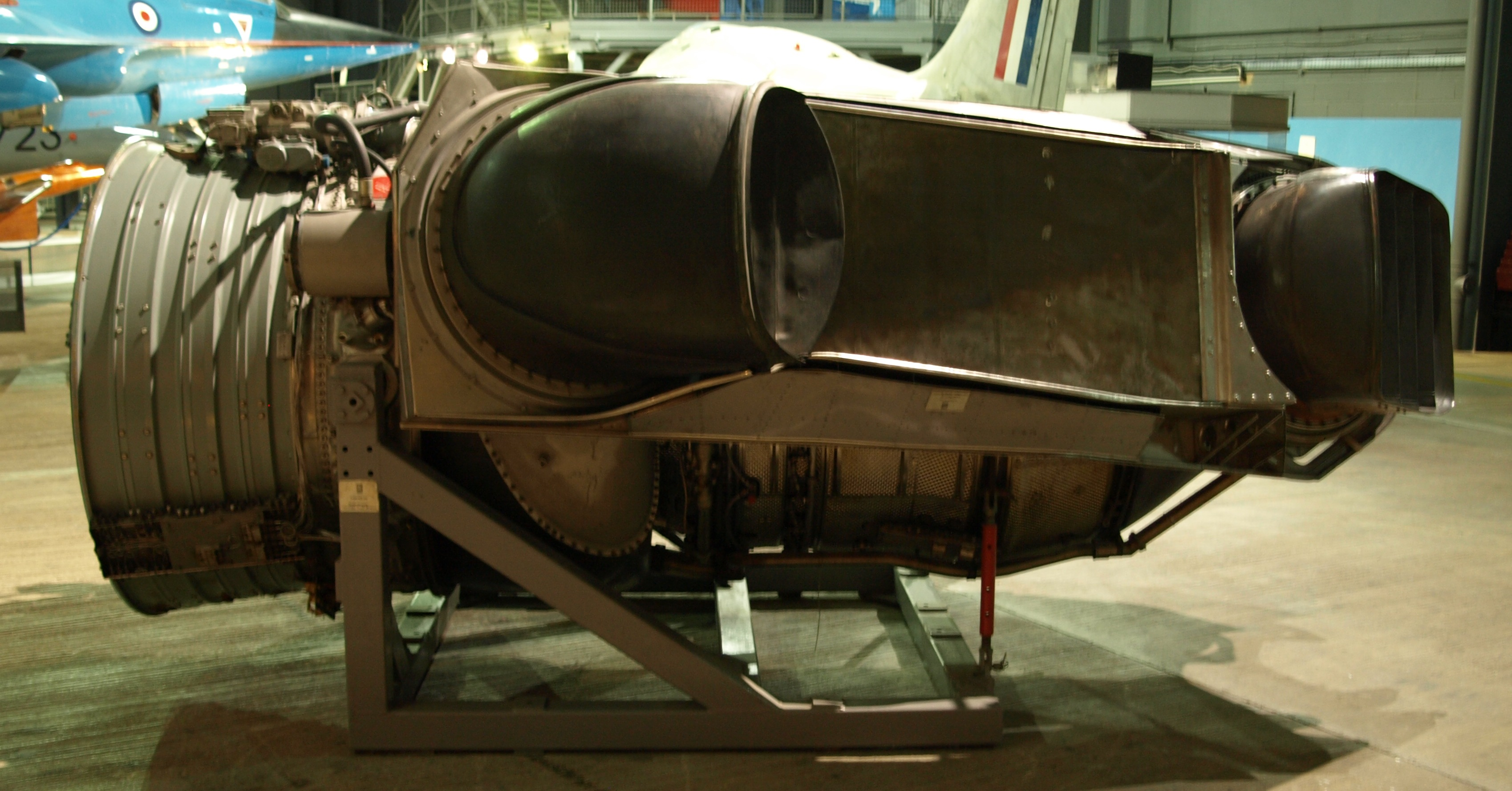
The plenum-chamber-burning Bristol Siddeley BS100 engine had thrust augmentation at the front nozzles only.

Thrust may be increased by burning fuel in a turbofan's cold bypass air, instead of the mixed cold and hot flows as in most afterburning turbofans.

An early augmented turbofan, the Pratt & Whitney TF30, used separate burning zones for the bypass and core flows with three of seven concentric spray rings in the bypass flow. In comparison, the afterburning Rolls-Royce Spey used a twenty chute mixer before the fuel manifolds.

Plenum chamber burning (PCB) was partially developed for the vectored thrust Bristol Siddeley BS100 engine for the Hawker Siddeley P.1154 until the program was cancelled in 1965. The cold bypass and hot core flows were split between two pairs of nozzles, front and rear, in the same manner as the Rolls-Royce Pegasus, and fuel was burned in the fan air before it left the front nozzles. It would have given greater thrust for take-off and supersonic performance in an aircraft similar to, but bigger than, the Hawker Siddeley Harrier.

Duct heating was used by Pratt & Whitney for their JTF17 turbofan proposal for the U.S. Supersonic Transport Program in 1964 and a demonstrator engine was run. The duct heater used an annular combustor and would be used for takeoff, climb and cruise at Mach 2.7 with different amounts of augmentation depending on aircraft weight.

== Design ==
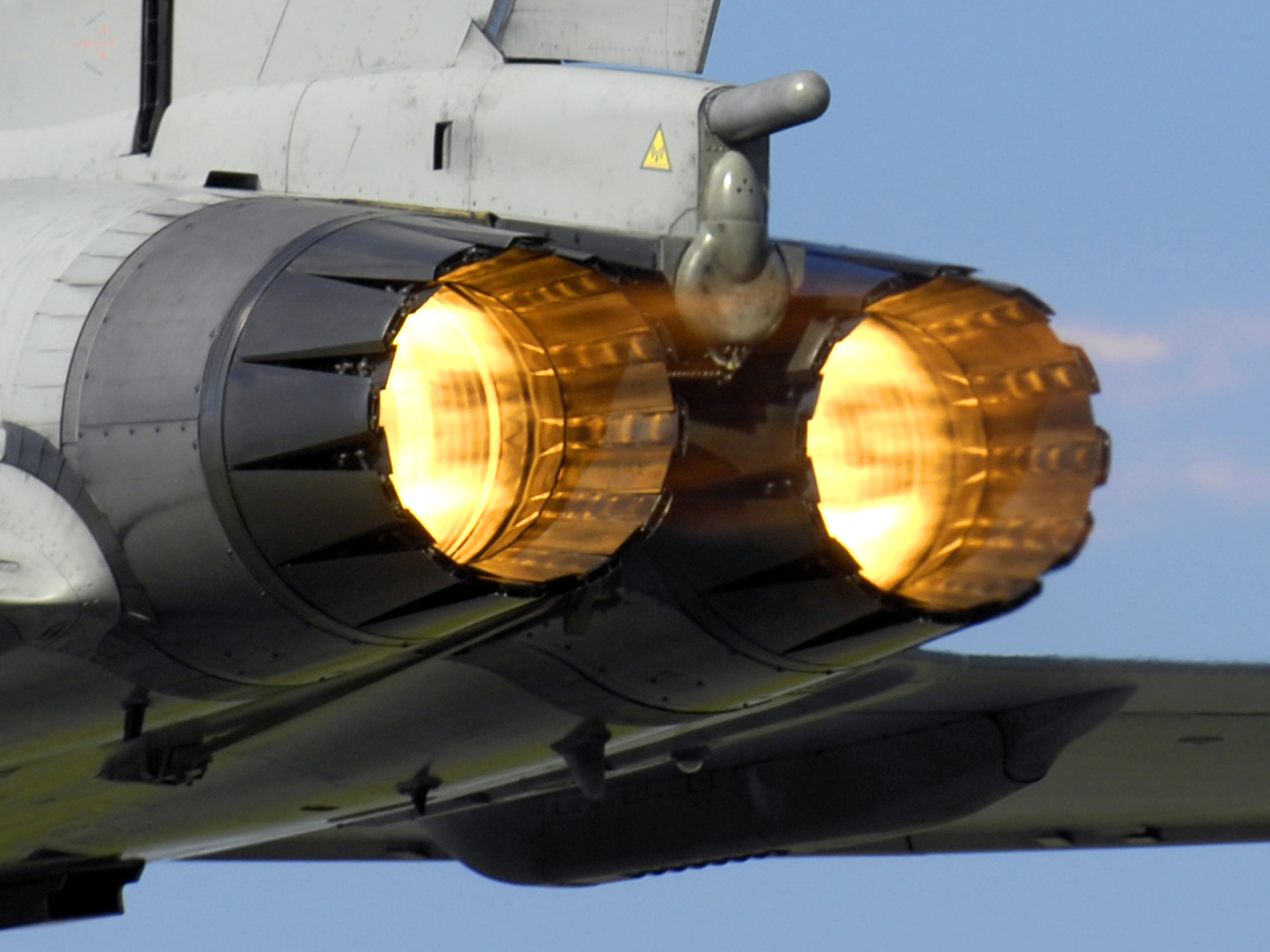
Afterburners on a British Eurofighter Typhoon

A jet engine afterburner is an extended exhaust section containing extra fuel injectors. Since the jet engine upstream (i.e., before the turbine) will use little of the oxygen it ingests, additional fuel can be burned after the gas flow has left the turbines. When the afterburner is turned on, fuel is injected and igniters are fired. The resulting combustion process increases the afterburner exit (nozzle entry) temperature, resulting in a significant increase in engine thrust. In addition to the increase in afterburner exit stagnation temperature, there is also an increase in nozzle mass flow (i.e. afterburner entry mass flow plus the effective afterburner fuel flow), but a decrease in afterburner exit stagnation pressure (owing to a fundamental loss due to heating plus friction and turbulence losses).

The resulting increase in afterburner exit volume flow is accommodated by increasing the throat area of the exit nozzle. Otherwise, if pressure is not released, the gas can flow upstream and re-ignite, possibly causing a compressor stall (or fan surge in a turbofan application). The first designs, e.g. Solar afterburners used on the F7U Cutlass, F-94 Starfire and F-89 Scorpion, had 2-position eyelid nozzles. Modern designs incorporate not only variable-geometry (VG) nozzles but multiple stages of augmentation via separate spray bars.

To a first order, the gross thrust ratio (afterburning/dry) is directly proportional to the root of the stagnation temperature ratio across the afterburner (i.e. exit/entry).

== Limitations ==
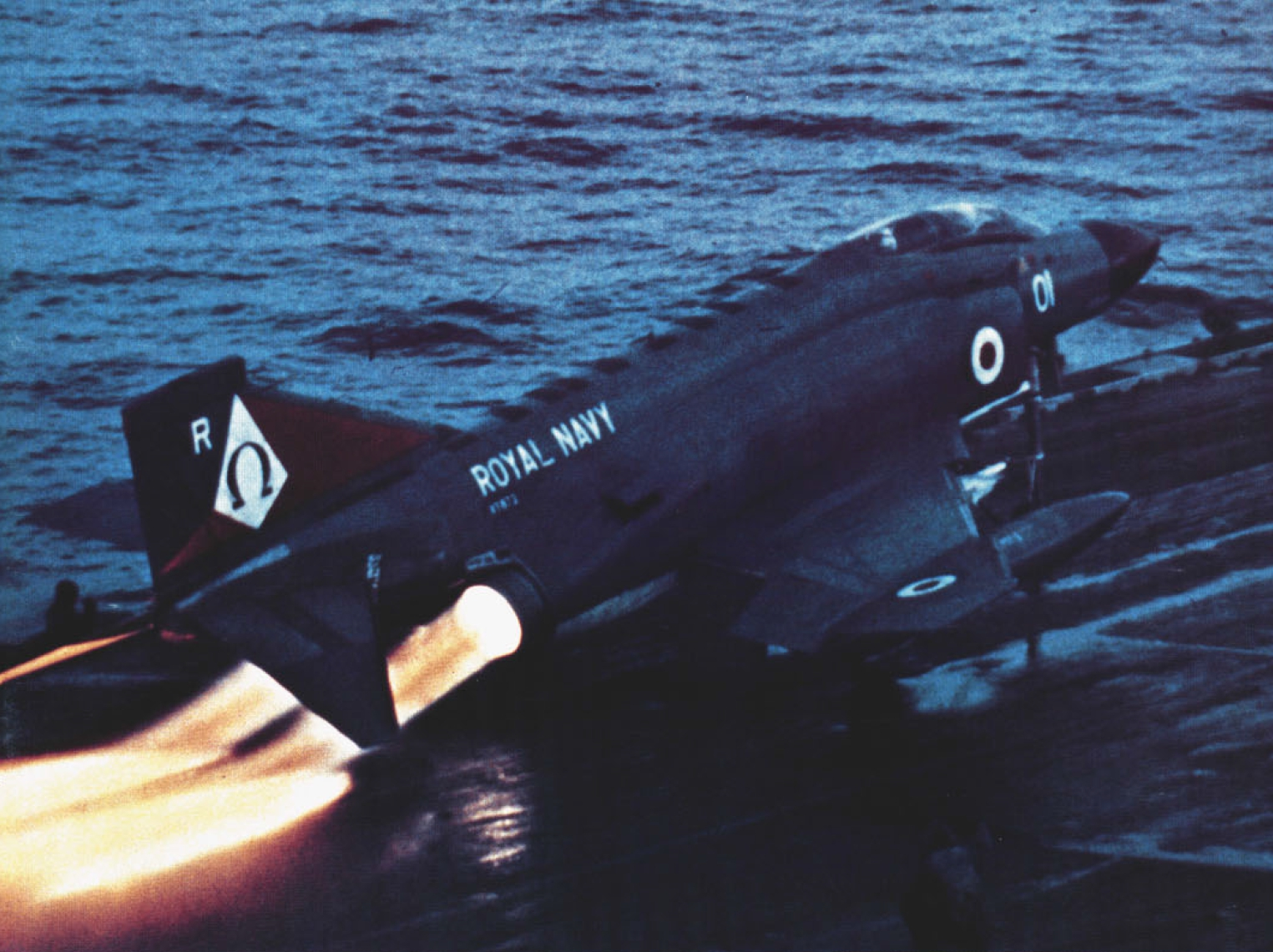
An F-4K Phantom of the Royal Navy on a catapult aboard an aircraft carrier deploys full afterburner prior to launch

Due to their high fuel consumption, afterburners are only used for short-duration, high-thrust requirements. These include heavy-weight or short-runway take-offs, assisting catapult launches from aircraft carriers, and during air combat. A notable exception is the Pratt & Whitney J58 engine used in the SR-71 Blackbird which used its afterburner for prolonged periods and was refueled in-flight as part of every reconnaissance mission.

An afterburner has a limited life to match its intermittent use. The J58 was an exception with a continuous rating. This was achieved with thermal barrier coatings on the liner and flame holders and by cooling the liner and nozzle with compressor bleed air instead of turbine exhaust gas.

== Efficiency ==
In heat engines such as jet engines, efficiency is highest when combustion occurs at the highest pressure and temperature possible, and expanded down to ambient pressure (see Carnot cycle).

Since the exhaust gas already has a reduced oxygen content, owing to previous combustion, and since the fuel is not burning in a highly compressed air column, the afterburner is generally inefficient in comparison to the main combustion process. Afterburner efficiency also declines significantly if, as is usually the case, the inlet and tailpipe pressure decreases with increasing altitude.

This limitation applies only to turbojets. In a military turbofan combat engine, the bypass air is added into the exhaust, thereby increasing the core and afterburner efficiency. In turbojets the gain is limited to 50%, whereas in a turbofan it depends on the bypass ratio and can be as much as 70%.

However, as a counterexample, the SR-71 had reasonable efficiency at high altitude in afterburning ("wet") mode owing to its high speed (Mach 3.2) and correspondingly high pressure due to ram intake.

== Influence on cycle choice ==
Afterburning has a significant influence upon engine cycle choice.

Lowering the fan pressure ratio decreases specific thrust (both dry and afterburning), but results in a lower temperature entering the afterburner. Since the afterburning exit temperature is effectively fixed, the temperature rise across the unit increases, raising the afterburner fuel flow. The total fuel flow tends to increase faster than the net thrust, resulting in a higher specific fuel consumption (SFC). However, the corresponding dry power SFC improves (i.e. lower specific thrust). The high temperature ratio across the afterburner results in a good thrust boost.

If the aircraft burns a large percentage of its fuel with the afterburner engaged, it is beneficial to select an engine cycle with a high specific thrust (i.e. a high fan pressure ratio or a low bypass ratio). The resulting engine is relatively fuel efficient with afterburning (i.e. in combat or during take-off), but suboptimal in dry power. If, however, the afterburner is to be hardly used, a low specific thrust (low fan pressure ratio/high bypass ratio) cycle will be favored.

Often the engine designer is faced with a compromise between these two extremes.

== History ==
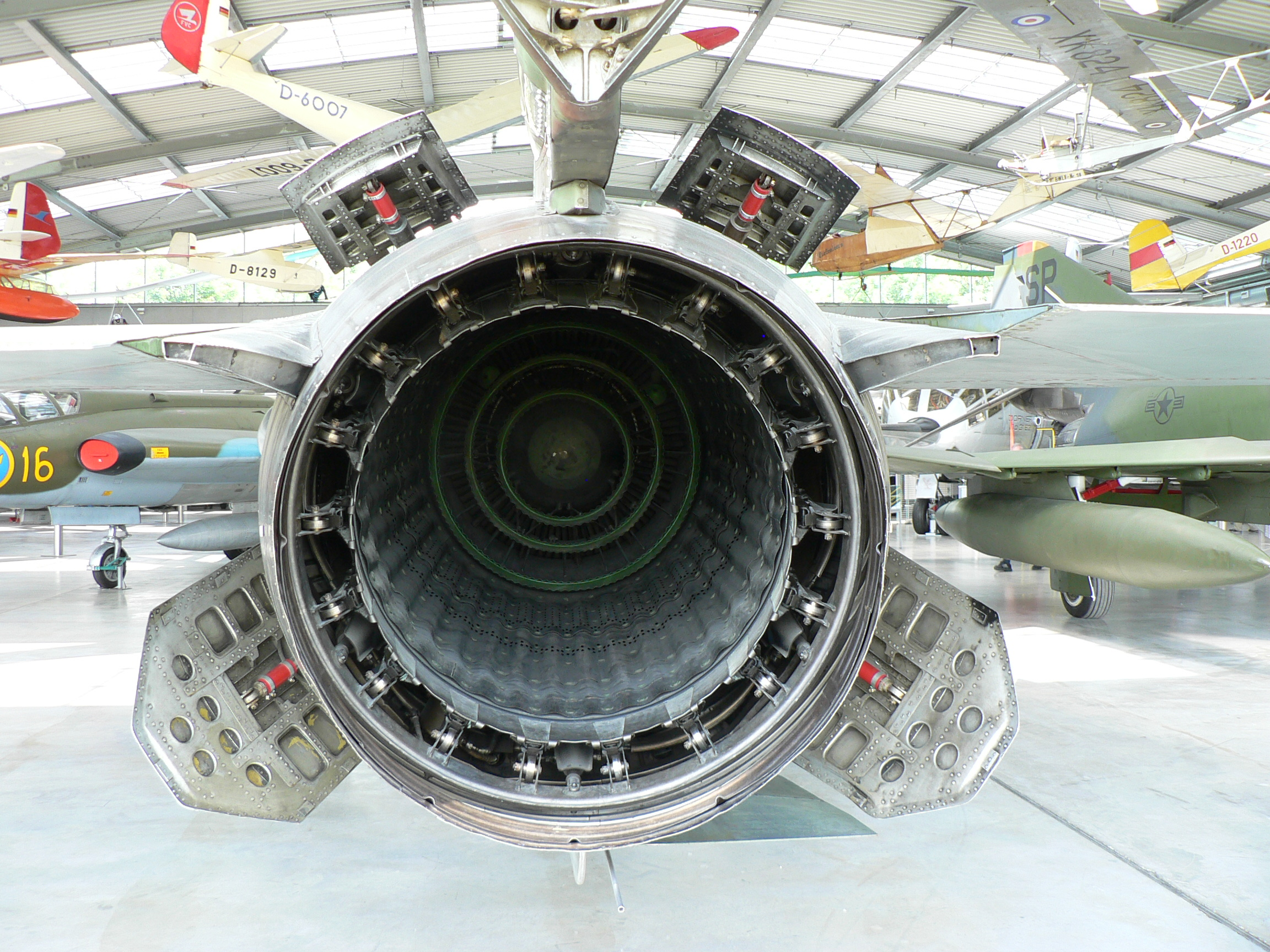
MiG-23 afterburner

The Caproni Campini C.C.2 motorjet, designed by the Italian engineer Secondo Campini, was the first aircraft to incorporate an afterburner. The first flight of a C.C.2, with its afterburners operating, took place on 11 April 1941.

Early British afterburner ("reheat") work included flight tests on a Rolls-Royce W2/B23 in a Gloster Meteor I in late 1944 and ground tests on a Power Jets W2/700 engine in mid-1945. This engine was destined for the Miles M.52 supersonic aircraft project.

Early American research on the concept was done by NACA, in Cleveland, Ohio, leading to the publication of the paper "Theoretical Investigation of Thrust Augmentation of Turbojet Engines by Tail-pipe Burning" in January 1947.

American work on afterburners in 1948 resulted in installations on early straight-wing jets such as the Pirate, Starfire and Scorpion.

The new Pratt & Whitney J48 turbojet, at 8,000 lbf (36 kN) thrust with afterburners, would power the Grumman swept-wing fighter F9F-6, which was about to go into production. Other new Navy fighters with afterburners included the Chance Vought F7U-3 Cutlass, powered by two 6,000 lbf (27 kN) thrust Westinghouse J46 engines.

In the 1950s, several large afterburning engines were developed, such as the Orenda Iroquois and the British de Havilland Gyron and Rolls-Royce Avon RB.146 variants. The Avon and its variants powered the English Electric Lightning, the first supersonic aircraft in RAF service. The Bristol-Siddeley/Rolls-Royce Olympus was fitted with afterburners for use with the BAC TSR-2. This system was designed and developed jointly by Bristol-Siddeley and Solar of San Diego. The afterburner system for the Concorde was developed by Snecma.

Afterburners are generally used only in military aircraft, and are considered standard equipment on fighter aircraft. The handful of civilian planes that have used them include some NASA research aircraft, the Tupolev Tu-144, Concorde and the White Knight of Scaled Composites. Concorde flew long distances at supersonic speeds. Sustained high speeds would be impossible with the high fuel consumption of afterburner, and the plane used afterburners at takeoff and to minimize time spent in the high-drag transonic flight regime. Supersonic flight without afterburners is referred to as supercruise.

A turbojet engine equipped with an afterburner is called an "afterburning turbojet", whereas a turbofan engine similarly equipped is sometimes called an "augmented turbofan".

A "dump-and-burn" is an airshow display feature where fuel is jettisoned, then intentionally ignited using the afterburner. A spectacular flame combined with high speed makes this a popular display for airshows, or as a finale to fireworks. Fuel dumping is used primarily to reduce the weight of an aircraft to avoid a heavy, high-speed landing. Other than for safety or emergency reasons, fuel dumping does not have a practical use.

== See also ==
- Aerospike engine
- Components of jet engines
- Index of aviation articles
- Propelling nozzle
- Ramjet
