= Fanno flow =

Fluid flow through a constant-area duct with friction

In fluid dynamics, Fanno flow (after Italian engineer Gino Girolamo Fanno) is the adiabatic flow through a constant area duct where the effect of friction is considered. Compressibility effects often come into consideration, although the Fanno flow model certainly also applies to incompressible flow. For this model, the duct area remains constant, the flow is assumed to be steady and one-dimensional, and no mass is added within the duct. The Fanno flow model is considered an irreversible process due to viscous effects. The viscous friction causes the flow properties to change along the duct. The frictional effect is modeled as a shear stress at the wall acting on the fluid with uniform properties over any cross section of the duct.

For a flow with an upstream Mach number greater than 1.0 in a sufficiently long duct, deceleration occurs and the flow can become choked. On the other hand, for a flow with an upstream Mach number less than 1.0, acceleration occurs and the flow can become choked in a sufficiently long duct. It can be shown that for flow of calorically perfect gas the maximum entropy occurs at M = 1.0.

== Theory ==
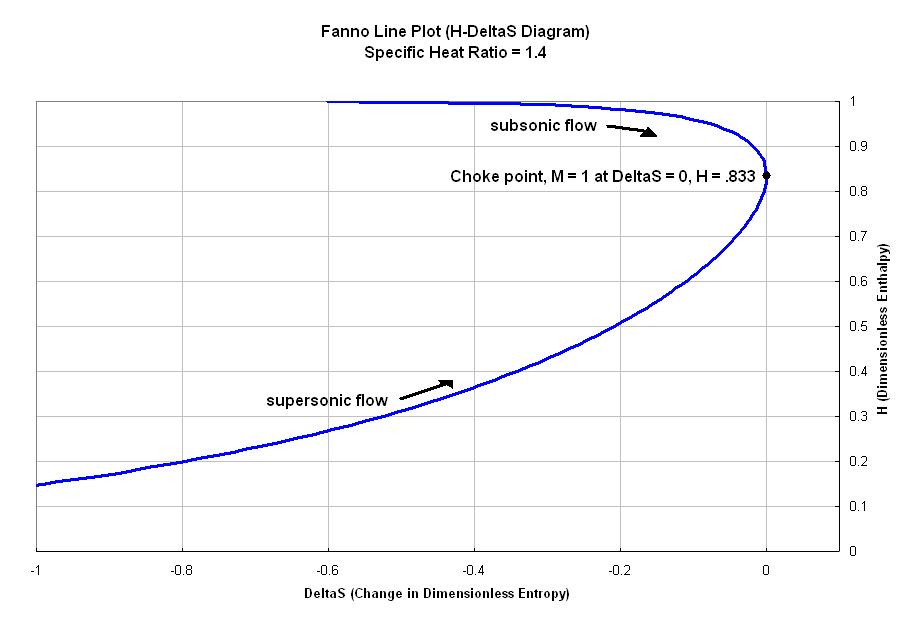
Figure 1 A Fanno Line is plotted on the dimensionless H-ΔS axis.

The Fanno flow model begins with a differential equation that relates the change in Mach number with respect to the length of the duct, dM/dx. Other terms in the differential equation are the heat capacity ratio, γ, the Fanning friction factor, f, and the hydraulic diameter, D_{h}:

$$\ \frac{dM^2}{M^2} = \frac{\gamma M^2}{1 - M^2}\left(1 + \frac{\gamma - 1}{2}M^2\right)\frac{4f}{D_h}dx$$

Assuming the Fanning friction factor is a constant along the duct wall, the differential equation can be solved easily. One must keep in mind, however, that the value of the Fanning friction factor can be difficult to determine for supersonic and especially hypersonic flow velocities. The resulting relation is shown below where L* is the required duct length to choke the flow assuming the upstream Mach number is supersonic. The left-hand side is often called the Fanno parameter.

$$\ \frac{4fL^*}{D_h} = \left(\frac{1 - M^2}{\gamma M^2}\right) + \left(\frac{\gamma + 1}{2\gamma}\right)\ln\left[\frac{M^2}{\left(\frac{2}{\gamma + 1}\right)\left(1 + \frac{\gamma - 1}{2}M^2\right)}\right]$$

Equally important to the Fanno flow model is the dimensionless ratio of the change in entropy over the heat capacity at constant pressure, c_{p}.

$$\ \Delta S = \frac{\Delta s}{c_p} = \ln\left[M^\frac{\gamma - 1}{\gamma}\left(\left[\frac{2}{\gamma + 1}\right]\left[1 + \frac{\gamma - 1}{2}M^2\right]\right)^\frac{-(\gamma + 1)}{2\gamma}\right]$$

The above equation can be rewritten in terms of a static to stagnation temperature ratio, which, for a calorically perfect gas, is equal to the dimensionless enthalpy ratio, H:

$$\ H = \frac{h}{h_0} = \frac{c_pT}{c_pT_0} = \frac{T}{T_0}$$

$$\ \Delta S = \frac{\Delta s}{c_p} = \ln\left[\left(\frac{1}{H} - 1\right)^\frac{\gamma - 1}{2\gamma}\left(\frac{2}{\gamma - 1}\right)^\frac{\gamma - 1}{2\gamma}\left(\frac{\gamma + 1}{2}\right)^\frac{\gamma + 1}{2\gamma}\left(H\right)^\frac{\gamma + 1}{2\gamma}\right]$$

The equation above can be used to plot the Fanno line, which represents a locus of states for given Fanno flow conditions on an H-ΔS diagram. In the diagram, the Fanno line reaches maximum entropy at H = 0.833 and the flow is choked. According to the Second law of thermodynamics, entropy must always increase for Fanno flow. This means that a subsonic flow entering a duct with friction will have an increase in its Mach number until the flow is choked. Conversely, the Mach number of a supersonic flow will decrease until the flow is choked. Each point on the Fanno line corresponds with a different Mach number, and the movement to choked flow is shown in the diagram.

The Fanno line defines the possible states for a gas when the mass flow rate and total enthalpy are held constant, but the momentum varies. Each point on the Fanno line will have a different momentum value, and the change in momentum is attributable to the effects of friction.

== Additional Fanno flow relations ==
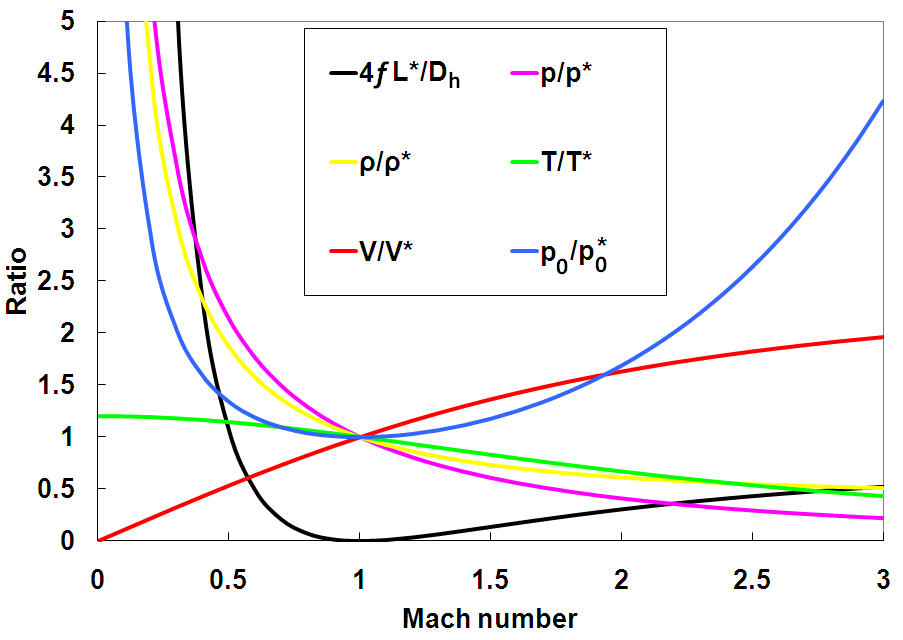
Figure 2 Common thermodynamic property ratios plotted as a function of Mach number using the Fanno flow model.

As was stated earlier, the area and mass flow rate in the duct are held constant for Fanno flow. Additionally, the stagnation temperature remains constant. These relations are shown below with the * symbol representing the throat location where choking can occur. A stagnation property contains a 0 subscript.

$$\begin{align}
A &= A^* = \mbox{constant} \\
T_0 &= T_0^* = \mbox{constant} \\
\dot{m} &= \dot{m}^* = \mbox{constant}
\end{align}$$

Differential equations can also be developed and solved to describe Fanno flow property ratios with respect to the values at the choking location. The ratios for the pressure, density, temperature, velocity and stagnation pressure are shown below, respectively. They are represented graphically along with the Fanno parameter.

$$\begin{align}
\frac{p}{p^*} &= \frac{1}{M}\frac{1}{\sqrt{\left(\frac{2}{\gamma + 1}\right)\left(1 + \frac{\gamma - 1}{2}M^2\right)}} \\
\frac{\rho}{\rho^*} &= \frac{1}{M}\sqrt{\left(\frac{2}{\gamma + 1}\right)\left(1 + \frac{\gamma - 1}{2}M^2\right)} \\
\frac{T}{T^*} &= \frac{1}{\left(\frac{2}{\gamma + 1}\right)\left(1 + \frac{\gamma - 1}{2}M^2\right)} \\
\frac{V}{V^*} &= M\frac{1}{\sqrt{\left(\frac{2}{\gamma + 1}\right)\left(1 + \frac{\gamma - 1}{2}M^2\right)}} \\
\frac{p_0}{p_0^*} &= \frac{1}{M}\left[\left(\frac{2}{\gamma + 1}\right)\left(1 + \frac{\gamma - 1}{2}M^2\right)\right]^\frac{\gamma + 1}{2\left(\gamma - 1\right)}
\end{align}$$

== Applications ==
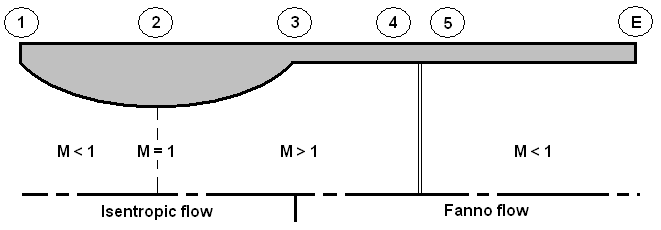
Figure 3 A supersonic nozzle leading into a constant area duct is depicted. The initial conditions exist at point 1. Point 2 exists at the nozzle throat, where M = 1. Point 3 labels the transition from isentropic to Fanno flow. Points 4 and 5 give the pre- and post-shock wave conditions, and point E is the exit from the duct.

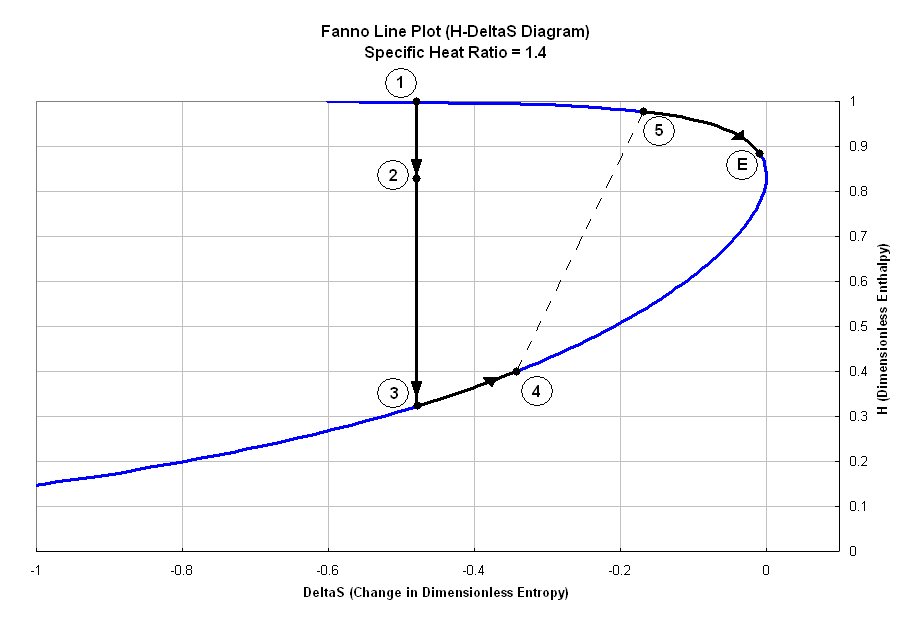
Figure 4 The H-S diagram is depicted for the conditions of Figure 3. Entropy is constant for isentropic flow, so the conditions at point 1 move down vertically to point 3. Next, the flow follows the Fanno line until a shock changes the flow from supersonic to subsonic. The flow then follows the Fanno line again, almost reaching a choked condition before exiting the duct.

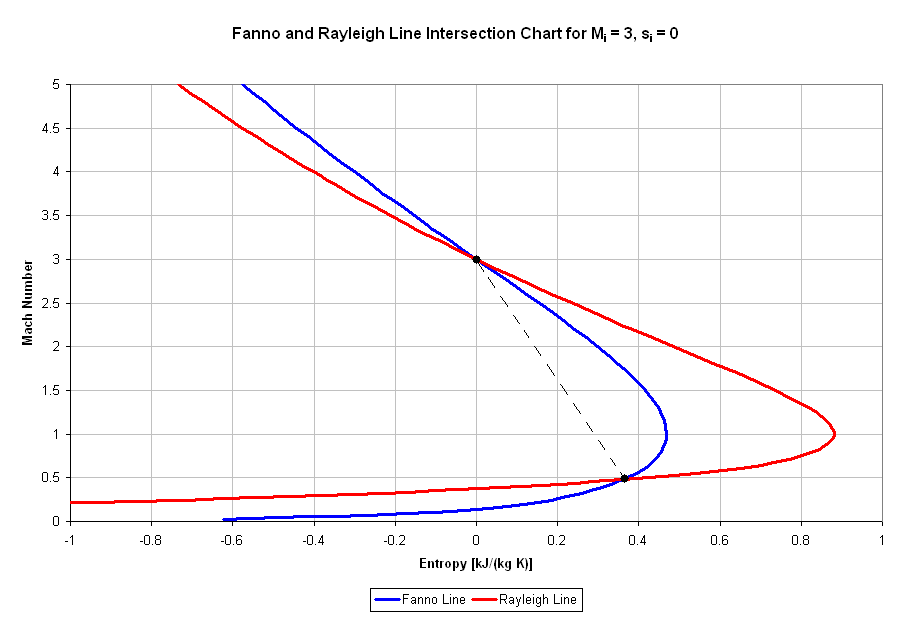
Figure 5 Fanno and Rayleigh Line Intersection Chart.

The Fanno flow model is often used in the design and analysis of nozzles. In a nozzle, the converging or diverging area is modeled with isentropic flow, while the constant area section afterwards is modeled with Fanno flow. For given upstream conditions at point 1 as shown in Figures 3 and 4, calculations can be made to determine the nozzle exit Mach number and the location of a normal shock in the constant area duct. Point 2 labels the nozzle throat, where M = 1 if the flow is choked. Point 3 labels the end of the nozzle where the flow transitions from isentropic to Fanno. With a high enough initial pressure, supersonic flow can be maintained through the constant area duct, similar to the desired performance of a blowdown-type supersonic wind tunnel. However, these figures show the shock wave before it has moved entirely through the duct. If a shock wave is present, the flow transitions from the supersonic portion of the Fanno line to the subsonic portion before continuing towards M = 1. The movement in Figure 4 is always from the left to the right in order to satisfy the second law of thermodynamics.

The Fanno flow model is also used extensively with the Rayleigh flow model. These two models intersect at points on the enthalpy-entropy and Mach number-entropy diagrams, which is meaningful for many applications. However, the entropy values for each model are not equal at the sonic state. The change in entropy is 0 at M = 1 for each model, but the previous statement means the change in entropy from the same arbitrary point to the sonic point is different for the Fanno and Rayleigh flow models. If initial values of s_{i} and M_{i} are defined, a new equation for dimensionless entropy versus Mach number can be defined for each model. These equations are shown below for Fanno and Rayleigh flow, respectively.

$$\begin{align}
\Delta S_F &= \frac{s - s_i}{c_p} = \ln\left[\left(\frac{M}{M_i}\right)^\frac{\gamma - 1}{\gamma}\left(\frac{1 + \frac{\gamma - 1}{2}M_i^2}{1 + \frac{\gamma - 1}{2}M^2}\right)^\frac{\gamma + 1}{2\gamma}\right] \\
\Delta S_R &= \frac{s - s_i}{c_p} = \ln\left[\left(\frac{M}{M_i}\right)^2\left(\frac{1 + \gamma M_i^2}{1 + \gamma M^2}\right)^\frac{\gamma + 1}{\gamma}\right]
\end{align}$$

Figure 5 shows the Fanno and Rayleigh lines intersecting with each other for initial conditions of s_{i} = 0 and M_{i} = 3. The intersection points are calculated by equating the new dimensionless entropy equations with each other, resulting in the relation below.

$$\ \left(1 + \frac{\gamma - 1}{2}M_i^2\right)\left[\frac{M_i^2}{\left(1 + \gamma M_i^2\right)^2}\right] = \left(1 + \frac{\gamma - 1}{2}M^2\right)\left[\frac{M^2}{\left(1 + \gamma M^2\right)^2}\right]$$

The intersection points occur at the given initial Mach number and its post-normal shock value. For Figure 5, these values are M = 3 and 0.4752, which can be found the normal shock tables listed in most compressible flow textbooks. A given flow with a constant duct area can switch between the Fanno and Rayleigh models at these points.

== See also ==
- Rayleigh flow
- Mass injection flow
- Isentropic process
- Isothermal flow
- Gas dynamics
- Compressible flow
- Choked flow
- Enthalpy
- Entropy
- Isentropic nozzle flow
