= Fanno =

Fanno may refer to:

- Fano (militia), sometimes spelled Fanno, a term for ethnic Amhara militias in Ethiopia
- Fanno Creek, a tributary of the Tualatin River in the U.S. state of Oregon
- Gino Girolamo Fanno (1882–1962), Italian mechanical engineer who developed the Fanno flow model
  - Fanno flow

== See also ==
- Fano (disambiguation)
