= Rayleigh flow =

Model of fluid flow through a frictionless constant-area duct with heat transfer

In fluid dynamics, Rayleigh flow (after English physicist Lord Rayleigh) refers to frictionless, non-adiabatic fluid flow through a constant-area duct where the effect of heat transfer is considered. Compressibility effects often come into consideration, although the Rayleigh flow model certainly also applies to incompressible flow. For this model, the duct area remains constant and no mass is added within the duct. Therefore, unlike Fanno flow, the stagnation temperature is a variable. The heat addition causes a decrease in stagnation pressure, which is known as the Rayleigh effect and is critical in the design of combustion systems. Heat addition will cause both supersonic and subsonic Mach numbers to approach Mach 1, resulting in choked flow. Conversely, heat rejection decreases a subsonic Mach number and increases a supersonic Mach number along the duct. It can be shown that for calorically perfect flows the maximum entropy occurs at M = 1.

== Theory ==
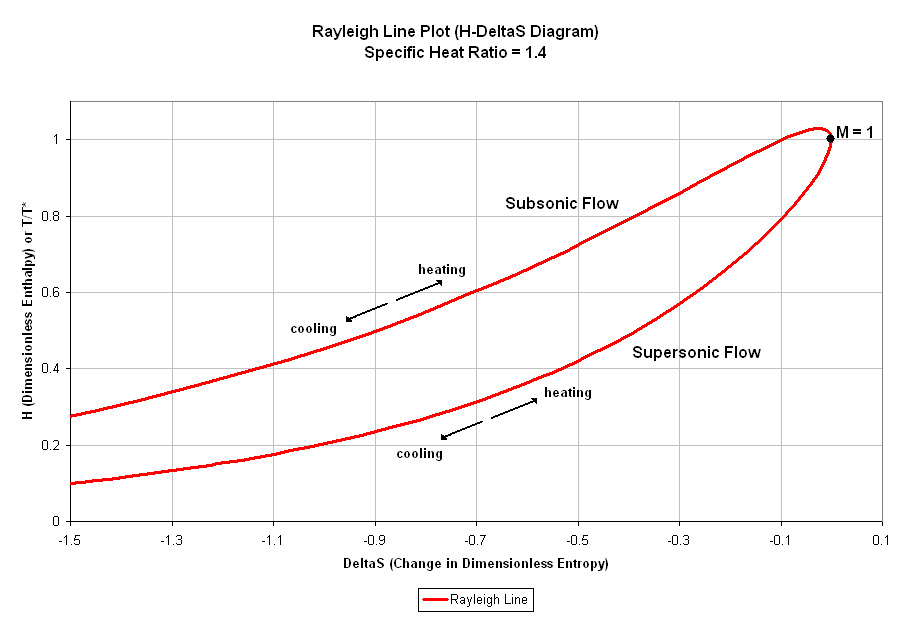
Figure 1 A Rayleigh Line is plotted on the dimensionless H-ΔS axis.

The Rayleigh flow model begins with a differential equation that relates the change in Mach number with the change in stagnation temperature, T_{0}. The differential equation is shown below.

$$\ \frac{dM^2}{M^2} = \frac{1 + \gamma M^2}{1 - M^2}\left(1 + \frac{\gamma - 1}{2}M^2\right)\frac{dT_0}{T_0}$$

Solving the differential equation leads to the relation shown below, where T_{0}* is the stagnation temperature at the throat location of the duct which is required for thermally choking the flow.

$$\ \frac{T_0}{T_0^*} = \frac{2\left(\gamma + 1\right)M^2}{\left(1 + \gamma M^2\right)^2}\left(1 + \frac{\gamma - 1}{2}M^2\right)$$

These values are significant in the design of combustion systems. For example, if a turbojet combustion chamber has a maximum temperature of T_{0}* = 2000 K, T_{0} and M at the entrance to the combustion chamber must be selected so thermal choking does not occur, which will limit the mass flow rate of air into the engine and decrease thrust.

For the Rayleigh flow model, the dimensionless change in entropy relation is shown below.

$$\ \Delta S = \frac{\Delta s}{c_p} = -\ln\left[M^2\left(\frac{\gamma + 1}{1 + \gamma M^2}\right)^\frac{\gamma + 1}{\gamma}\right]$$

The above equation can be used to plot the Rayleigh line on a Mach number versus ΔS graph, but the dimensionless enthalpy, H, versus ΔS diagram, is more often used. The dimensionless enthalpy equation is shown below with an equation relating the static temperature with its value at the choke location for a calorically perfect gas where the heat capacity at constant pressure, c_{p}, remains constant.

$$\begin{align}
H &= \frac{h}{h^*} = \frac{c_pT}{c_pT^*} = \frac{T}{T^*} \\
\frac{T}{T^*} &= \frac{\left(\gamma + 1\right)^2M^2}{\left(1 + \gamma M^2\right)^2} \\
\end{align}$$

The above equation can be manipulated to solve for M as a function of H. However, due to the form of the T/T* equation, a complicated multi-root relation is formed for M = M(T/T*). Instead, M can be chosen as an independent variable where ΔS and H can be matched up in a chart as shown in Figure 1. Figure 1 shows that heating will increase an upstream, subsonic Mach number until M = 1.0 and the flow chokes. Conversely, adding heat to a duct with an upstream, supersonic Mach number will cause the Mach number to decrease until the flow chokes. Cooling produces the opposite result for each of those two cases. The Rayleigh flow model reaches maximum entropy at M = 1.0 For subsonic flow, the maximum value of H occurs at M = 0.845. This indicates that cooling, instead of heating, causes the Mach number to move from 0.845 to 1.0 This is not necessarily correct as the stagnation temperature always increases to move the flow from a subsonic Mach number to M = 1, but from M = 0.845 to M = 1.0 the flow accelerates faster than heat is added to it. Therefore, this is a situation where heat is added but T/T* decreases in that region.

== Additional relations ==
The area and mass flow rate are held constant for Rayleigh flow. Unlike Fanno flow, the Fanning friction factor, f, remains constant. These relations are shown below with the * symbol representing the throat location where choking can occur.

$$\begin{align}
A &= A^* = \mbox{constant} \\
\dot{m} &= \dot{m}^* = \mbox{constant} \\
\end{align}$$

Differential equations can also be developed and solved to describe Rayleigh flow property ratios with respect to the values at the choking location. The ratios for the pressure, density, static temperature, velocity and stagnation pressure are shown below, respectively. They are represented graphically along with the stagnation temperature ratio equation from the previous section. A stagnation property contains a '0' subscript.

$$\begin{align}
\frac{p}{p^*} &= \frac{\gamma + 1}{1 + \gamma M^2} \\
\frac{\rho}{\rho^*} &= \frac{1 + \gamma M^2}{\left(\gamma + 1\right)M^2} \\
\frac{T}{T^*} &= \frac{\left(\gamma + 1\right)^2M^2}{\left(1 + \gamma M^2\right)^2} \\
\frac{v}{v^*} &= \frac{\left(\gamma + 1\right)M^2}{1 + \gamma M^2} \\
\frac{p_0}{p_0^*} &= \frac{\gamma + 1}{1 + \gamma M^2}\left[\left(\frac{2}{\gamma + 1}\right)\left(1 + \frac{\gamma - 1}{2}M^2\right)\right]^\frac{\gamma}{\gamma - 1}
\end{align}$$

== Applications ==
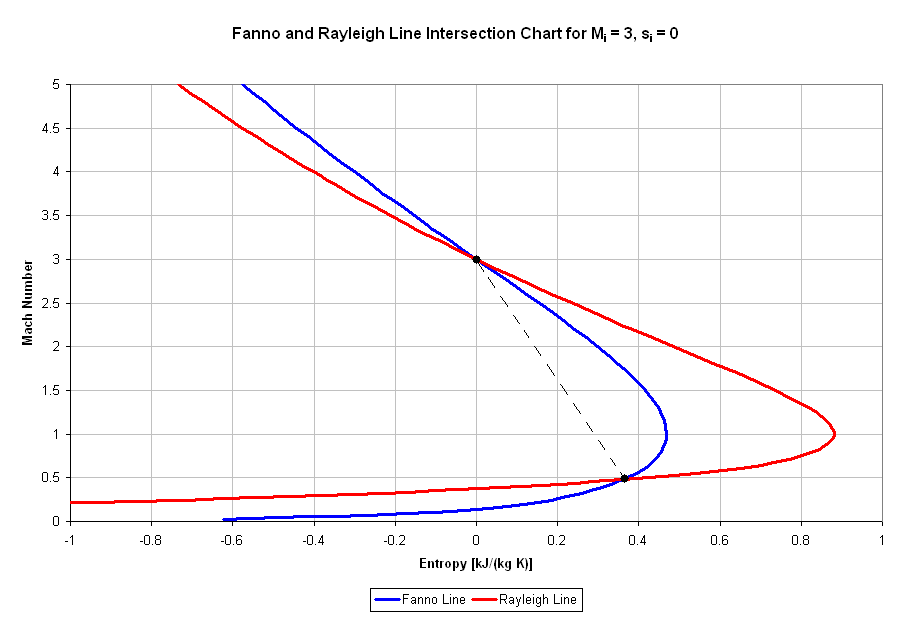
Figure 3 Fanno and Rayleigh Line Intersection Chart.

The Rayleigh flow model has many analytical uses, most notably involving aircraft engines. For instance, the combustion chambers inside turbojet engines usually have a constant area and the fuel mass addition is negligible. These properties make the Rayleigh flow model applicable for heat addition to the flow through combustion, assuming the heat addition does not result in dissociation of the air-fuel mixture. Producing a shock wave inside the combustion chamber of an engine due to thermal choking is very undesirable due to the decrease in mass flow rate and thrust. Therefore, the Rayleigh flow model is critical for an initial design of the duct geometry and combustion temperature for an engine.

The Rayleigh flow model is also used extensively with the Fanno flow model. These two models intersect at points on the enthalpy-entropy and Mach number-entropy diagrams, which is meaningful for many applications. However, the entropy values for each model are not equal at the sonic state. The change in entropy is 0 at M = 1 for each model, but the previous statement means the change in entropy from the same arbitrary point to the sonic point is different for the Fanno and Rayleigh flow models. If initial values of s_{i} and M_{i} are defined, a new equation for dimensionless entropy versus Mach number can be defined for each model. These equations are shown below for Fanno and Rayleigh flow, respectively.

$$\begin{align}
\Delta S_F &= \frac{s - s_i}{c_p} = ln\left[\left(\frac{M}{M_i}\right)^\frac{\gamma - 1}{\gamma}\left(\frac{1 + \frac{\gamma - 1}{2}M_i^2}{1 + \frac{\gamma - 1}{2}M^2}\right)^\frac{\gamma + 1}{2\gamma}\right] \\
\Delta S_R &= \frac{s - s_i}{c_p} = ln\left[\left(\frac{M}{M_i}\right)^2\left(\frac{1 + \gamma M_i^2}{1 + \gamma M^2}\right)^\frac{\gamma + 1}{\gamma}\right]
\end{align}$$

Figure 3 shows the Rayleigh and Fanno lines intersecting with each other for initial conditions of s_{i} = 0 and M_{i} = 3.0 The intersection points are calculated by equating the new dimensionless entropy equations with each other, resulting in the relation below.

$$\ \left(1 + \frac{\gamma - 1}{2}M_i^2\right)\left[\frac{M_i^2}{\left(1 + \gamma M_i^2\right)^2}\right] = \left(1 + \frac{\gamma - 1}{2}M^2\right)\left[\frac{M^2}{\left(1 + \gamma M^2\right)^2}\right]$$

The intersection points occur at the given initial Mach number and its post-normal shock value. For Figure 3, these values are M = 3.0 and 0.4752, which can be found the normal shock tables listed in most compressible flow textbooks. A given flow with a constant duct area can switch between the Rayleigh and Fanno models at these points.

== See also ==
- Fanno flow
- Mass injection flow
- Isentropic process
- Isothermal flow
- Gas dynamics
- Compressible flow
- Choked flow
- Enthalpy
- Entropy
