= Fano (disambiguation) =

Fano is a town in central Italy.

Fano may also refer to:

== Places ==
- Fanø, an island of Denmark
- Fano, Gijón, a district in Asturias, Spain
- Fanò, the Italian name of the Ionian Island Othonoi

== People with the surname ==
- Gino Fano (1871–1952), Italian mathematician
- Guido Alberto Fano (1875–1961), Italian pianist and composer
- Johan Fano (born 1978), Peruvian footballer
- Logan Fano (born 2002), American football player
- Michel Fano (born 1929), French serialist composer
- Robert Fano (1917–2016), Italian-American computer scientist
- Spencer Fano (born 2004), American football player
- Ugo Fano (1912–2001), Italian-American physicist

== Other uses ==
- Fano (militia), ethnic Amhara militas in Ethiopia.
- Fano Guitars, an American guitar builder
- Fano plane, a finite projective plane of order 2
- Fano variety, an algebraic variety
- Battle of Fano, a battle in 271 between the Roman Empire and the Juthungi near the Italian city

== See also ==
- Fanno (disambiguation)
