= Stagnation enthalpy =

In thermodynamics and fluid mechanics, the stagnation enthalpy of a fluid is the static enthalpy of the fluid at a stagnation point. The stagnation enthalpy is also called total enthalpy. At a point where the flow does not stagnate, it corresponds to the static enthalpy of the fluid at that point assuming it was brought to rest from velocity $V$ isentropically. That means all the kinetic energy was converted to internal energy without losses and is added to the local static enthalpy. When the potential energy of the fluid is negligible, the mass-specific stagnation enthalpy represents the total energy of a flowing fluid stream per unit mass.

Stagnation enthalpy, or total enthalpy, is the sum of the static enthalpy (associated with the temperature and static pressure at that point) plus the enthalpy associated with the dynamic pressure, or velocity. This can be expressed in a formula in various ways. Often it is expressed in specific quantities, where specific means mass-specific, to get an intensive quantity:

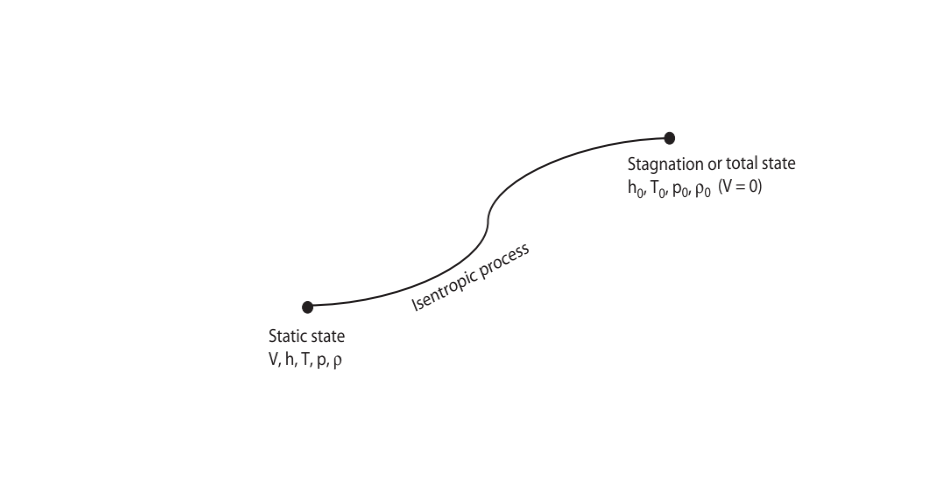
Static and stagnation states in a fluid.

$$h_0 = h + \frac{V^2}{2}$$

where:

$h_0 =$ mass-specific total enthalpy, in [J/kg]
$h =$ mass-specific static enthalpy, in [J/kg]
$V =$ fluid velocity at the point of interest, in [m/s]
$\frac{V^2}{2} =$ mass-specific kinetic energy, in [J/kg]

The volume-specific version of this equation (in units of energy per volume, [J/m^3] is obtained by multiplying the equation with the fluid density $\rho$:

$$h_0^* = h^* + \rho\frac{V^2}{2}$$

where:

$h_0^* =$ volume-specific total enthalpy, in [J/m^3]
$h^* =$ volume-specific static enthalpy, in [J/m^3]
$V =$ fluid velocity at the point of interest, in [m/s]
$\rho =$ fluid density at the point of interest, in [kg/m^3]
$\rho\frac{V^2}{2} =$ volume-specific kinetic energy, in [J/m^3]

The non-specific version of this equation, that means extensive quantities are used, is:

$$H_0 = H + m\frac{V^2}{2}$$

where:

$H_0 =$ total enthalpy, in [J]
$H =$ static enthalpy, in [J]
$m =$ fluid mass, in [kg]
$V =$ fluid velocity at the point of interest, in [m/s]
$m\frac{V^2}{2} =$ kinetic energy, in [J]

The suffix ‘0’ usually denotes the stagnation condition and is used as such here.

Enthalpy is the energy associated with the temperature plus the energy associated with the pressure. The stagnation enthalpy adds a term associated with the kinetic energy of the fluid mass.

The total enthalpy for a real or ideal gas does not change across a shock. The total enthalpy can not be measured directly. Instead, the static enthalpy and the fluid velocity can be measured. Static enthalpy is often used in the energy equation for a fluid.

== See also ==
- Stagnation pressure
- Stagnation temperature
- Rothalpy
