= Rothalpy =

Fluid mechanical property

Rothalpy (or rothalpy) $I$, a short name of rotational stagnation enthalpy, is a fluid mechanical property of importance in the study of flow within rotating systems.

== Concept ==
Consider we have an inertial frame of reference $XYZ$ and a rotating frame of reference $xyz$ which both are sharing common origin $O$. Assume that frame $xyz$ is rotating around a fixed axis with angular velocity $\mathbf {\omega}$. Now assuming fluid velocity to be $\mathbf {V}$ and fluid velocity relative to rotating frame of reference to be $\mathbf {w}=\mathbf {V}-\mathbf {u}$:

Rothalpy of a fluid point $P$ can be defined as

$I=h_{0,rel}-\frac{u^2}{2}$

where $\mathbf {u}=\mathbf {\omega}\times\mathbf {r}$ and $\mathbf {r}=\vec{OP}$ and $h_{0,rel}$ is the stagnation enthalpy of fluid point $P$ relative to the rotating frame of reference $xyz$, which is given by

$h_{0,rel}=h+\frac{w^2}{2}$

and is known as relative stagnation enthalpy.

Rothalpy can also be defined in terms of absolute stagnation enthalpy:

$I=h_0-uV_\theta$

where $V_\theta$ is tangential component of fluid velocity $\mathbf {V}$.

== Applications ==
Rothalpy has applications in turbomachinery and study of relative flows in rotating systems.

One such application is that for steady, adiabatic and irreversible flow in a turbomachine, the value of rothalpy across a blade remains constant along a flow streamline:

$I=const.$

so Euler equation of turbomachinery can be written in terms of rothalpy.

This form of the Euler work equation shows that, for rotating blade rows, the relative stagnation enthalpy is constant through the blades provided the blade speed is constant. In other words, $h_{0,rel}=const.$, if the radius of a streamline passing through the blades stays the same. This result is important for analyzing turbomachinery flows in the relative frame of reference.

== Naming ==
The function $I$ was first introduced by Wu (1952) and has acquired the widely used name rothalpy.

The word rothalpy is a portmanteau of rotational enthalpy. Since "rotation" and "enthalpy" derived from Latin and Greek respectively, it is sometimes referred to as trothalpy to satisfy the semantics of adopting new words into English, now derived from the Greek word trochos for wheel.

== See also ==
- Stagnation enthalpy
- Euler's pump and turbine equation
