= Isothermal flow =

Model of fluid flow

Isothermal flow is a model of compressible fluid flow whereby the flow remains at the same temperature while flowing in a conduit. In the model, heat transferred through the walls of the conduit is offset by frictional heating back into the flow. Although the flow temperature remains constant, a change in stagnation temperature occurs because of a change in velocity. The interesting part of this flow is that the flow is choked at $1/\sqrt{k}$ and not at Mach number equal to one as in the case of many other model such as Fanno flow. This fact applies to real gases as well as ideal gases.

For the important practical case of a gas flow through a long tube, the model has applicability in situations where distance is relatively long and heat transfer is relatively rapid so temperature can be treated, for engineering purposes, as a constant. This model also has applicability as upper boundary to Fanno flow.

== See also ==
- Fanno flow
- Isentropic process
- Rayleigh flow
