= Fano, Gijón =

Coordinates: 43.4551°N 5.6259°W

Fano
- Parish
- Interactive map of Fano
- Country: Spain
- Autonomous community: Asturias
- Province: Asturias
- Municipality: Gijón

Population (2016)
  - Total: 217

Fano is a parish of the municipality of Gijón / Xixón, in Asturias, Spain. In 2012, its population was 220. Located in the south-east of the municipality, Fano is a rural area which borders the municipality of Siero in the south, and with the district of Valdornón in the east.

Toponym comes from Latin Fanum, a kind of temples ancient Romans built in pre-Roman cults sacred places. A Benedictine monastery existed in Fano from 12th to 17th centuries. Its front romanesque façade is nowadays part of the San Juan Evangelista de Fano church.

== Villages and their neighbourhoods ==
Carceo

- Cadianes
- Carbonero

La Cuadra

- La Bustia
- Llagarón

Fano

- La Malata
- El Regatu
- La Zurraquera

Zalce

- El Caleyu
- Llongares
- El Piñíu
- Viesques
