= Fano Guitars =

American guitar manufacturer

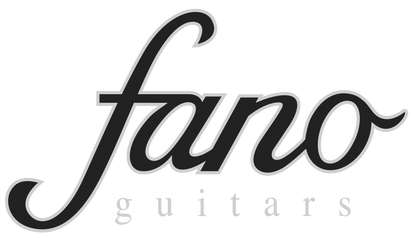
- Industry: Musical instrument
- Founders: Dennis Fano, Founder
- Headquarters: Scottsdale, Arizona, United States
- Products: Electric guitars
- Owner: Desert Son Musical Instruments, LLC
- Website: fanoguitars.com

Fano Guitars is an American manufacturing company founded by luthier Dennis Fano in Fleetwood, Pennsylvania, producing electric guitars. Fano is a brand of Desert Son Musical Instruments, LLC.

Fano has acquired a reputation for building boutique guitars; among its more unconventional models is the Fano Stratosphear, with a body made of plexiglass covered with aluminum. Fano's "Alt de Facto" guitar line blends characteristics of Fender, Rickenbacker, Gretsch and Gibson guitars. The affordable Fano Standard line of guitars was launched in 2016 and includes the JM6, SP6, TC6 and RB6.

== History ==
Dennis Fano, founder of the company, repaired guitars at Matt Umanov Guitars in New York until 2001, when he decided to pursue guitar building full-time. Originally, Fano repaired and modified bass guitars, with one of the first models Fano modified were his Fender Jazz Bass and a Harmony bass.

== Models ==
=== Alt de Facto ===
Fano's flagship guitar model is the Alt de Facto, which is available in a range styles and configurations, including a "distressed" finish which gives the guitar the appearance of being well-worn. The Alt de Facto has been reviewed by a wide range of guitar publications, including: Vintage Guitar.

=== Standard Series ===
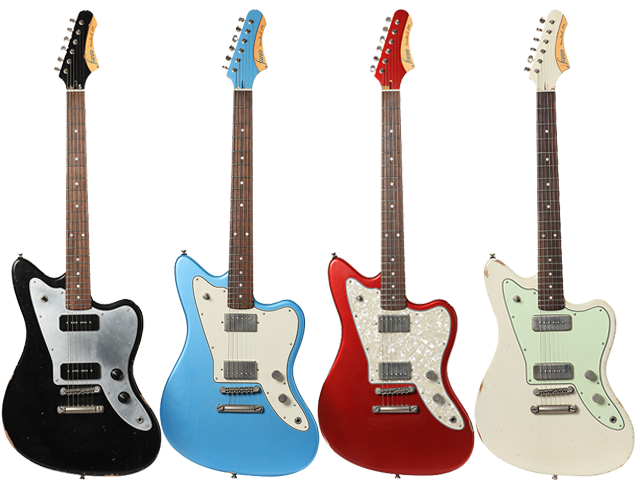
Fano Standard Series JM6 Guitars

Fano introduced the Standard Series line of guitars, made up of the JM6 and SP6 models, in January 2016. In 2017 the RB6 and TC6 Standard models were added to the line along with a total of 8 vintage colors and 2 different styles of nitrocellulose finishes, medium "distress" or "NOS".

On 12 January 2018, Fano introduced the Standard Series bass guitar, JM4-FB. The guitar will be launched at the winter NAMM Show in Anaheim, California and shipped to the authorized Fano dealers in January and February 2018.

== Critical acclaim ==
Of the Fano Standard Series JM6 guitar, reviewer Chris Loeffler of Harmony Central said, "The Fano Standard JM6 really is a workhorse of a guitar...well-appointed without being flashy, comfortable, and unique-looking without ever getting too far from what most players expect."

== Musicians who play Fano guitars ==
Fano Guitars are played and endorsed by a wide range of professional guitarists, including: Jared Scharff (Saturday Night Live), Walter Becker (Steely Dan), Scott Sharrard (Gregg Allman Band), Eric Jason Brock (Three Across and The Eric Jason Brock Band), and Conor Oberst

Fano JM6 was used by Gary Clark Jr. and Matthew Followill of Kings of Leon. Followill is also known to play PX6, TC6, SP6, RB6 and GF6.
