= Gino Girolamo Fanno =

Italian mechanical engineer (1882–1962)

Gino Girolamo Fanno (Conegliano, 18 November 1882 – Pegli, 23 March 1962) was an Italian mechanical engineer who developed the Fanno flow model.

== Early life and education ==
Fanno studied in a technical institute in Venice and graduated with very high grades as a mechanical engineer. Fanno was not as lucky as his brother, who was not able to get into academia. Faced with antisemitism, Fanno left Italy for Zurich, Switzerland, in 1900 to attend graduate school for his master's degree. In Zurich he was able to pose as a Roman Catholic. For short time he went to live in the Jewish home, Isaak Baruch Weil's family.

As were many Jews at that time, Fanno was fluent in several languages including Italian, English, German, and French. He likely had a good knowledge of Yiddish and possibly some Hebrew. In July 1904 he received his master's diploma.

== Career ==
Fanno later returned to Italy to find a job in industry. Fanno turned out to be a good engineer and he later obtained a management position. He married, and like his brother, Marco, was childless. He obtained a Ph.D. from Regio Istituto Superiore d'Ingegneria di Genova. However, in February, 1939, Fanno was denounced as a Jew and lost his Ph.D.

During World War II, he was put under house arrest to avoid being sent to the concentration camps. To further camouflage himself, Fanno converted to Catholicism. Apparently, Fanno had a cache of old Italian currency (which was apparently still acceptable) that helped him and his wife survive the war. After the war, Fanno was only able to work in agriculture and agricultural engineering. Fanno died without world recognition for his model.

== See also ==
- Fanno flow
