= Stagnation pressure =

Sum of the static and dynamic pressure

In fluid dynamics, stagnation pressure, also referred to as total pressure, is what the pressure would be if all the kinetic energy of the fluid were to be converted into pressure in a reversible manner. It is defined as the sum of the free-stream static pressure and the free-stream dynamic pressure.

The Bernoulli equation applicable to incompressible flow shows that the stagnation pressure is equal to the dynamic pressure and static pressure combined. In compressible flows, stagnation pressure is also equal to total pressure as well, provided that the fluid entering the stagnation point is brought to rest isentropically.

Stagnation pressure is sometimes referred to as pitot pressure because the two pressures are equal.

== Magnitude ==
The magnitude of stagnation pressure can be derived from Bernoulli equation for incompressible flow and no height changes. For any two points 1 and 2:

$$P_1 + \tfrac{1}{2} \rho v_1^2 = P_2 + \tfrac{1}{2} \rho v_2^2$$

The two points of interest are 1) in the freestream flow at relative speed $v$ where the pressure is called the "static" pressure, (for example well away from an airplane moving at speed $v$); and 2) at a "stagnation" point where the fluid is at rest with respect to the measuring apparatus (for example at the end of a pitot tube in an airplane).

Then

$$P_\text{static} + \tfrac{1}{2} \rho v^2 = P_\text{stagnation} + \tfrac{1}{2} \rho (0)^2$$

or

$$P_\text{stagnation}=P_\text{static} + \tfrac{1}{2} \rho v^2$$

where:

$P_\text{stagnation}$ is the stagnation pressure
$\rho\;$ is the fluid density
$v$ is the speed of fluid
$P_\text{static}$ is the static pressure

So the stagnation pressure is increased over the static pressure, by the amount $\tfrac{1}{2} \rho v^2$ which is called the "dynamic" or "ram" pressure because it results from fluid motion. In our airplane example, the stagnation pressure would be atmospheric pressure plus the dynamic pressure.

In compressible flow however, the fluid density is higher at the stagnation point than at the static point. Therefore, $\tfrac{1}{2} \rho v^2$ can't be used for the dynamic pressure. For many purposes in compressible flow, the stagnation enthalpy or stagnation temperature plays a role similar to the stagnation pressure in incompressible flow.

== Compressible flow ==
Stagnation pressure is the static pressure a gas retains when brought to rest isentropically from Mach number M.

$$\frac{p_t}{p} = \left(1 + \frac{\gamma -1}{2} M^2\right)^{\frac{\gamma}{\gamma-1}}\,$$

or, assuming an isentropic process, the stagnation pressure can be calculated from the ratio of stagnation temperature to static temperature:

$$\frac{p_t}{p} = \left(\frac{T_t}{T}\right)^{\frac{\gamma}{\gamma-1}}\,$$

where:

$p_t$ is the stagnation pressure
$p$ is the static pressure
$T_t$ is the stagnation temperature
$T$ is the static temperature
$\gamma$ is the ratio of specific heats

The above derivation holds only for the case when the gas is assumed to be calorically perfect (specific heats and the ratio of the specific heats $\gamma$ are assumed to be constant with temperature).

== See also ==
- Hydraulic ram
- Stagnation temperature
