= Perfect gas =

Theoretical gas model

In physics, engineering, and physical chemistry, a perfect gas is a theoretical gas model that differs from real gases in specific ways that makes certain calculations easier to handle. In all perfect gas models, intermolecular forces are neglected. This means that one can neglect many complications that may arise from the Van der Waals forces. All perfect gas models are ideal gas models in the sense that they all follow the ideal gas equation of state. However, the idea of a perfect gas model is often invoked as a combination of the ideal gas equation of state with specific additional assumptions regarding the variation (or nonvariation) of the heat capacity with temperature.

== Perfect gas nomenclature ==
The terms perfect gas and ideal gas are sometimes used interchangeably, depending on the particular field of physics and engineering. Sometimes, other distinctions are made, such as between thermally perfect gas and calorically perfect gas, or between imperfect, semi-perfect, and perfect gases, and as well as the characteristics of ideal gases. Two of the common sets of nomenclatures are summarized in the following table.

Nomenclature 1	Nomenclature 2	Heat capacity at constant $V$, $C_V$, or constant $P$, $C_P$	Ideal-gas law $PV = nRT$ and $C_P - C_V = nR$
Calorically perfect	Perfect	Constant	Yes
Thermally perfect	Semi-perfect	T-dependent	Yes
	Ideal	May or may not be T -dependent	Yes
Imperfect	Imperfect, or non-ideal	T and P-dependent	No

=== Thermally and calorically perfect gas ===
Along with the definition of a perfect gas, there are also two more simplifications that can be made although various textbooks either omit or combine the following simplifications into a general "perfect gas" definition.

For a fixed number of moles of gas $n$, a thermally perfect gas

- is in thermodynamic equilibrium
- is not chemically reacting
- has internal energy $U$, enthalpy $H$, and constant volume / constant pressure heat capacities $C_V$, $C_P$ that are solely functions of temperature and not of pressure $P$ or volume $V$, i.e., $U = U(T)$, $H = H(T)$, $dU = C_V (T) dT$, $dH = C_P (T) dT$. These latter expressions hold for all tiny property changes and are not restricted to constant-$V$ or constant-$P$ variations.

A calorically perfect gas

- is in thermodynamic equilibrium
- is not chemically reacting
- has internal energy $U$, and enthalpy $H$ that are functions of temperature only, i.e., $U = U(T)$, $H = H(T)$
- has heat capacities $C_V$, $C_P$ that are constant, i.e., $dU = C_V dT$, $dH = C_P dT$ and $\Delta U = C_V \Delta T$, $\Delta H = C_P \Delta T$, where $\Delta$ is any finite (non-differential) change in each quantity.

It can be easily shown that an ideal gas (i.e. satisfying the ideal gas equation of state, $PV = nRT$) is either calorically perfect or thermally perfect. This is because the internal energy of an ideal gas is at most a function of temperature, as shown by the thermodynamic equation $\left({{\partial U} \over {\partial V}}\right)_T = T\left({{\partial S} \over {\partial V}}\right)_T - P = T\left({{\partial P} \over {\partial T}}\right)_V - P,$ which is exactly zero when $P = nRT / V$. Since $U$ is independent of volume, it must be true that for fixed $n$, $U$ and $H=U+pV=U+nRT$ are at most functions of only temperature for the ideal gas equation of state. This is also true for the two heat capacities, which are temperature derivatives of $U$ and $H$.

From both statistical mechanics and the simpler kinetic theory of gases, we expect the heat capacity of a monatomic ideal gas to be constant, since for such a gas only kinetic energy contributes to the internal energy and to within an arbitrary additive constant $U = (3/2) n R T$, and therefore $C_V = (3/2) n R$, a constant. Moreover, the classical equipartition theorem predicts that all ideal gases (even polyatomic) have constant heat capacities at all temperatures. However, it is now known from the modern theory of quantum statistical mechanics as well as from experimental data that a polyatomic ideal gas will generally have thermal contributions to its internal energy which are not linear functions of temperature. These contributions are due to contributions from the vibrational, rotational, and electronic degrees of freedom as they become populated as a function of temperature according to the Boltzmann distribution. In this situation we find that $C_V (T)$ and $C_P (T)$. But even if the heat capacity is strictly a function of temperature for a given gas, it might be assumed constant for purposes of calculation if the temperature and heat capacity variations are not too large, which would lead to the assumption of a calorically perfect gas (see below).

These types of approximations are useful for modeling, for example, an axial compressor where temperature fluctuations are usually not large enough to cause any significant deviations from the thermally perfect gas model. In this model the heat capacity is still allowed to vary, though only with temperature, and molecules are not permitted to dissociate. The latter generally implies that the temperature should be limited to < 2500 K. This temperature limit depends on the chemical composition of the gas and how accurate the calculations need to be, since molecular dissociation may be important at a higher or lower temperature which is intrinsically dependent on the molecular nature of the gas.

Even more restricted is the calorically perfect gas for which, in addition, the heat capacity is assumed to be constant. Although this may be the most restrictive model from a temperature perspective, it may be accurate enough to make reasonable predictions within the limits specified. For example, a comparison of calculations for one compression stage of an axial compressor (one with variable $C_P$ and one with constant $C_P$) may produce a deviation small enough to support this approach.

In addition, other factors come into play and dominate during a compression cycle if they have a greater impact on the final calculated result than whether or not $C_P$ was held constant. When modeling an axial compressor, examples of these real-world effects include compressor tip-clearance, separation, and boundary layer/frictional losses.

== See also ==
- Gas
- Gas laws
- Ideal gas
- Ideal gas law
- Equation of state
