= Choked flow =

Compressible flow velocity limiting effect

Choked flow is a compressible flow effect. The parameter that becomes "choked" or "limited" is the fluid velocity.

Choked flow is a fluid dynamic condition associated with the Venturi effect. When a flowing fluid at a given pressure and temperature passes through a constriction (such as the throat of a convergent-divergent nozzle or a valve in a pipe) into a lower pressure environment the fluid velocity increases. At initially subsonic upstream conditions, the conservation of energy principle requires the fluid velocity to increase as it flows through the smaller cross-sectional area of the constriction. At the same time, the Venturi effect causes the static pressure, and therefore the density, to decrease at the constriction. Choked flow is a limiting condition where the mass flow cannot increase with a further decrease in the downstream pressure environment for a fixed upstream pressure and temperature.

For homogeneous fluids, the physical point at which the choking occurs for adiabatic conditions is when the exit plane velocity is at sonic conditions; i.e., at a Mach number of 1. At choked flow, the mass flow rate can be increased only by increasing the upstream density of the substance.

The choked flow of gases is useful in many engineering applications because the mass flow rate is independent of the downstream pressure, and depends only on the temperature and pressure and hence the density of the gas on the upstream side of the restriction. Under choked conditions, valves and calibrated orifice plates can be used to produce a desired mass flow rate.

== Choked flow in liquids ==
If the fluid is a liquid, a different type of limiting condition (also known as choked flow) occurs when the venturi effect acting on the liquid flow through the restriction causes a decrease of the liquid pressure beyond the restriction to below that of the liquid's vapor pressure at the prevailing liquid temperature. At that point, the liquid partially flashes into bubbles of vapor and the subsequent collapse of the bubbles causes cavitation. Cavitation is quite noisy and can be sufficiently violent to physically damage valves, pipes and associated equipment. In effect, the vapor bubble formation in the restriction prevents the flow from increasing any further.

== Mass flow rate of a gas at choked conditions ==
All gases flow from higher pressure to lower pressure. Choked flow can occur at the change of the cross section in a de Laval nozzle or through an orifice plate. The choked velocity is observed upstream of an orifice or nozzle. The upstream volumetric flow rate is lower than the downstream condition because of the higher upstream density. The choked velocity is a function of the upstream pressure but not the downstream. Although the velocity is constant, the mass flow rate is dependent on the density of the upstream gas, which is a function of the upstream pressure. Flow velocity reaches the speed of sound in the orifice, and it may be termed a sonic orifice.

=== Choking in change of cross section flow ===
Assuming ideal gas behavior, steady-state choked flow occurs when the downstream pressure falls below a critical value $p^{*}$. That critical value can be calculated from the dimensionless critical pressure ratio equation

$$\frac{p^*}{p_0} = \left(\frac{2}{\gamma + 1}\right)^\frac{\gamma}{\gamma - 1}$$,

where $\gamma$ is the heat capacity ratio $c_p/c_v$ of the gas and where $p_0$ is the total (stagnation) upstream pressure.

For air with a heat capacity ratio $\gamma = 1.4$, then $p^* = 0.528 p_0$; other gases have $\gamma$ in the range 1.09 (e.g. butane) to 1.67 (monatomic gases), so the critical pressure ratio varies in the range $0.487 < p^*/p_0 < 0.587$, which means that, depending on the gas, choked flow usually occurs when the downstream static pressure drops to below 0.487 to 0.587 times the absolute pressure in stagnant upstream source vessel.

When the gas velocity is choked, one can obtain the mass flowrate as a function of the upstream pressure. For isentropic flow Bernoulli's equation should hold:

$h + \frac{v^2}{2} = \frac{C_P T}{\mu} + \frac{v^2}{2} = const$,

where $h$ - is the enthalpy of gas, $C_P = \frac{\gamma}{\gamma - 1}R$ - molar specific heat at constant pressure, with $R$ being the universal gas constant, $T$ - absolute temperature. If we neglect the initial gas velocity upstream, we can obtain the ultimate gas velocity as follows:

$v_{max} = \sqrt{\frac{2}{\mu}C_P T}$

In a choked flow this velocity happens to coincide exactly with the sonic velocity $c_s^*$ at the critical cross-section:

$c_s^* = \sqrt{\gamma\frac{p}{\rho^*}} = \sqrt{\frac{2}{\mu}C_P T} = v_{max}$,

where $\rho^*$ is the density at the critical cross-section. We can now obtain the pressure $p$ as:

$p = \frac{\rho^* {c_s^*}^2}{\gamma} = \frac{\dot{m}}{A^*} \frac{c_s^*}{\gamma}$,

taking in account that $\rho^* c_s^*\, A^* = \dot{m}$. Now remember that we have neglected gas velocity upstream, that is pressure at the critical section must be essentially the same or close to the stagnation pressure upstream $P_0 \approx p$, and $A^* \approx A$. Finally we obtain:

$\dot{m} = \gamma\, P_0\, A\, \left(\frac{2}{\mu} C_P\,T_0\right)^{-1/2}$

as an approximate equation for the mass flowrate.

The more precise equation for the choked mass flow rate is:

$$\dot{m} = C_d A \sqrt{\gamma \rho_0 P_0 \left(\frac{2}{\gamma + 1}\right)^\frac{\gamma + 1}{\gamma - 1}}$$

Where:
$\dot{m}$,	mass flow rate, in kg/s
$C_d$,	discharge coefficient, dimensionless
$A$,	discharge hole cross-sectional area, in m²
$\gamma$,	$\frac{c_p}{c_v}$ (Heat capacity ratio) of the gas
$c_p$,	specific heat of the gas at constant pressure
$c_v$,	specific heat of the gas at constant volume
$\rho_0$,	real gas (total) density at total pressure $P_0$ and total temperature $T_0$, in kg/m³
$P_0$,	absolute upstream total pressure of the gas, in Pa, or kg/m·s²
$T_0$,	absolute upstream total temperature of the gas, in K

The mass flow rate is primarily dependent on the cross-sectional area $A$ of the nozzle throat and the upstream pressure $P$, and only weakly dependent on the temperature $T$. The rate does not depend on the downstream pressure at all. All other terms are constants that depend only on the composition of the material in the flow. Although the gas velocity reaches a maximum and becomes choked, the mass flow rate is not choked. The mass flow rate can still be increased if the upstream pressure is increased as this increases the density of the gas entering the orifice.

The value of $C_d$ can be calculated using the below expression:

$$C_d = \frac{\dot{m}}{A \sqrt{2\rho\Delta P}}$$

Where:
$C_d$,	discharge coefficient through the constriction (dimensionless)
$A$,	cross-sectional area of flow constriction (unit length squared)
$\dot{m}$,	mass flow rate of fluid through constriction (unit mass of fluid per unit time)
$\rho$,	density of fluid (unit mass per unit volume)
$\Delta P$,	pressure drop across constriction (unit force per unit area)

The above equations calculate the steady state mass flow rate for the pressure and temperature existing in the upstream pressure source.

If the gas is being released from a closed high-pressure vessel, the above steady state equations may be used to approximate the initial mass flow rate. Subsequently, the mass flow rate decreases during the discharge as the source vessel empties and the pressure in the vessel decreases. Calculating the flow rate versus time since the initiation of the discharge is much more complicated, but more accurate.

The technical literature can be confusing because many authors fail to explain whether they are using the universal gas law constant R, which applies to any ideal gas or whether they are using the gas law constant R_{s}, which only applies to a specific individual gas. The relationship between the two constants is R_{s} = R / M where M is the molecular weight of the gas.

== Real gas effects ==
If the upstream conditions are such that the gas cannot be treated as ideal, there is no closed form equation for evaluating the choked mass flow. Instead, the gas expansion should be calculated by reference to real gas property tables, where the expansion takes place at constant enthalpy.

== Minimum pressure ratio required for choked flow to occur ==
The minimum pressure ratios required for choked conditions to occur (when some typical industrial gases are flowing) are presented in Table 1. The ratios were obtained using the criterion that choked flow occurs when the ratio of the absolute upstream pressure to the absolute downstream pressure is equal to or greater than $([\gamma + 1]/2)^{\gamma/(\gamma - 1)}$, where $\gamma$ is the specific heat ratio of the gas. The minimum pressure ratio may be understood as the ratio between the upstream pressure and the pressure at the nozzle throat when the gas is traveling at Mach 1; if the upstream pressure is too low compared to the downstream pressure, sonic flow cannot occur at the throat.

Table 1
Gas	$\gamma = \frac{c_p}{c_v}$	Min. P_{u}/P_{d} for choked flow
Dry air	1.400 at 20 °C	1.893
Nitrogen	1.404 at 15 °C	1.895
Oxygen	1.400 at 20 °C	1.893
Helium	1.660 at 20 °C	2.049
Hydrogen	1.410 at 20 °C	1.899
Methane	1.307	1.837
Propane	1.131	1.729
Butane	1.096	1.708
Ammonia	1.310 at 15 °C	1.838
Chlorine	1.355	1.866
Sulfur dioxide	1.290 at 15 °C	1.826
Carbon monoxide	1.404	1.895
Carbon dioxide	1.30	1.83

Notes:

- P_{u}, absolute upstream gas pressure
- P_{d}, absolute downstream gas pressure

== Venturi nozzles with pressure recovery ==
The flow through a venturi nozzle achieves a much lower nozzle pressure than downstream pressure. Therefore, the pressure ratio is the comparison between the upstream and nozzle pressure. Therefore, flow through a venturi can reach Mach 1 with a much lower upstream to downstream ratio.

== Thin-plate orifices ==
The flow of real gases through thin-plate orifices never becomes fully choked. The mass flow rate through the orifice continues to increase as the downstream pressure is lowered to a perfect vacuum, though the mass flow rate increases slowly as the downstream pressure is reduced below the critical pressure. Cunningham (1951) first drew attention to the fact that choked flow does not occur across a standard, thin, square-edged orifice.

=== Vacuum conditions ===
In the case of upstream air pressure at atmospheric pressure and vacuum conditions downstream of an orifice, both the air velocity and the mass flow rate become choked or limited when sonic velocity is reached through the orifice.

== The flow pattern ==
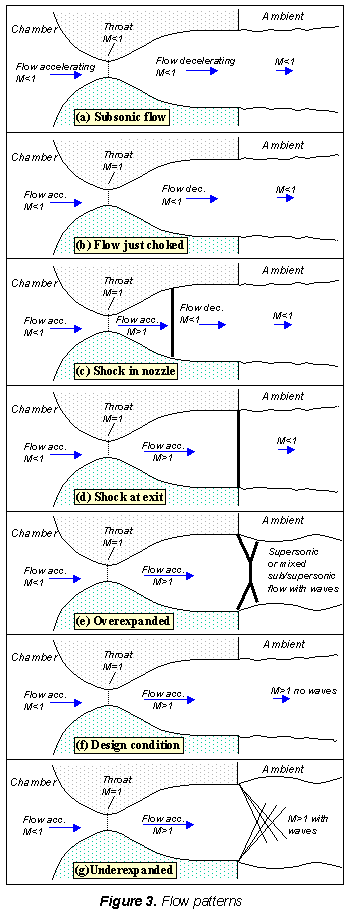
Figure 1. Flow patterns

Figure 1a shows the flow through the nozzle when it is completely subsonic (i.e. the nozzle is not choked). The flow in the chamber accelerates as it converges toward the throat, where it reaches its maximum (subsonic) speed at the throat. The flow then decelerates through the diverging section and exhausts into the ambient as a subsonic jet. In this state, lowering the back pressure increases the flow speed everywhere in the nozzle.

When the back pressure, p_{b}, is lowered enough, the flow speed is Mach 1 at the throat, as in figure 1b. The flow pattern is exactly the same as in subsonic flow, except that the flow speed at the throat has just reached Mach 1. Flow through the nozzle is now choked since further reductions in the back pressure can't move the point of M=1 away from the throat. However, the flow pattern in the diverging section does change as you lower the back pressure further.

As p_{b} is lowered below that needed to just choke the flow, a region of supersonic flow forms just downstream of the throat. Unlike in subsonic flow, the supersonic flow accelerates as it moves away from the throat. This region of supersonic acceleration is terminated by a normal shock wave. The shock wave produces a near-instantaneous deceleration of the flow to subsonic speed. This subsonic flow then decelerates through the remainder of the diverging section and exhausts as a subsonic jet. In this regime if you lower or raise the back pressure you move the shock wave away from (increase the length of supersonic flow in the diverging section before the shock wave) the throat.

If the p_{b} is lowered enough, the shock wave sits at the nozzle exit (figure 1d). Due to the long region of acceleration (the entire nozzle length) the flow speed reaches its maximum just before the shock front. However, after the shock the flow in the jet is subsonic.

Lowering the back pressure further causes the shock to bend out into the jet (figure 1e), and a complex pattern of shocks and reflections is set up in the jet that create a mixture of subsonic and supersonic flow, or (if the back pressure is low enough) just supersonic flow. Because the shock is no longer perpendicular to the flow near the nozzle walls, it deflects the flow inward as it leaves the exit producing an initially contracting jet. This is referred as overexpanded flow because in this case the pressure at the nozzle exit is lower than that in the ambient (the back pressure)- i.e. the flow has been expanded by the nozzle too much.

A further lowering of the back pressure changes and weakens the wave pattern in the jet. Eventually the back pressure becomes low enough so that it is now equal to the pressure at the nozzle exit. In this case, the waves in the jet disappear altogether (figure 1f), and the jet becomes uniformly supersonic. This situation, since it is often desirable, is referred to as the 'design condition'.

Finally, lowering the back-pressure even further creates a new imbalance between the exit and back pressures (exit pressure greater than back pressure), figure 1g. In this situation (called 'underexpanded') expansion waves (that produce gradual turning perpendicular to the axial flow and acceleration in the jet) form at the nozzle exit, initially turning the flow at the jet edges outward in a plume and setting up a different type of complex wave pattern.

== See also ==
- Accidental release source terms includes mass flow rate equations for non-choked gas flows as well.
- Orifice plate includes derivation of non-choked gas flow equation.
- de Laval nozzles are venturi tubes that produce supersonic gas velocities as the tube and the gas are first constricted and then the tube and gas are expanded beyond the choke plane.
- Rocket engine nozzles discusses how to calculate the exit velocity from nozzles used in rocket engines.
- Hydraulic jump
- High pressure jet
