= Stagnation temperature =

Concept in thermodynamics and fluid mechanics

In thermodynamics and fluid mechanics, stagnation temperature is the temperature at a stagnation point in a fluid flow. At a stagnation point, the speed of the fluid is zero and all of the kinetic energy has been converted to internal energy and is added to the local static enthalpy. In both compressible and incompressible fluid flow, the stagnation temperature equals the total temperature at all points on the streamline leading to the stagnation point. See gas dynamics.

== Derivation ==
=== Adiabatic ===
Stagnation temperature can be derived from the first law of thermodynamics. Applying the steady flow energy equation and ignoring the work, heat and gravitational potential energy terms, we have:

$$h_0 = h + \frac{V^2}{2}\,$$

where:

$h_0 =\,$ mass-specific stagnation (or total) enthalpy at a stagnation point
$h =\,$ mass-specific static enthalpy at the point of interest along the stagnation streamline
$V =\,$ velocity at the point of interest along the stagnation streamline

Substituting for enthalpy by assuming a constant specific heat capacity at constant pressure ($h = C_p T$) we have:

$$T_0 = T + \frac{V^2}{2C_p}\,$$

or

$$\frac{T_0}{T} =  1+\frac{\gamma-1}{2}M^2\,$$

where:

$C_p =\,$ specific heat capacity at constant pressure
$T_0 =\,$ stagnation (or total) temperature at a stagnation point
$T =\,$ temperature (or static temperature) at the point of interest along the stagnation streamline
$V = \,$ velocity at the point of interest along the stagnation streamline
$M =\,$ Mach number at the point of interest along the stagnation streamline
$\gamma =\,$ Ratio of Specific Heats ($C_p/C_v$), ~1.4 for air at ~300 K

=== Flow with heat addition ===
$$h_{02} = h_{01} + q$$
$$T_{02} = T_{01} + \frac{q}{C_p}$$
q = Heat per unit mass added into the system

Strictly speaking, enthalpy is a function of both temperature and density. However, invoking the common assumption of a calorically perfect gas, enthalpy can be converted directly into temperature as given above, which enables one to define a stagnation temperature in terms of the more fundamental property, stagnation enthalpy.

Stagnation properties (e.g., stagnation temperature, stagnation pressure) are useful in jet engine performance calculations. In engine operations, stagnation temperature is often called total air temperature. A bimetallic thermocouple is frequently used to measure stagnation temperature, but allowances for thermal radiation must be made.

== Solar thermal collectors ==
Performance testing of solar thermal collectors utilizes the term stagnation temperature to indicate the maximum achievable collector temperature with a stagnant fluid (no motion), an ambient temperature of 30C, and incident solar radiation of 1000W/m^{2}. The aforementioned figures are 'worst case scenario values' that allow collector designers to plan for potential overheat scenarios in the event of collector system malfunctions.

== See also ==
- Stagnation point
- Stagnation pressure
- Total air temperature
