= Flamant =

Flamant is the French for flamingo.

It may refer to:

- Flamant (company), a European interior decoration brand
- The Dassault MD 315 Flamant, an aircraft
- Flamant class patrol vessel, a type of ship
- Flamant solution, the solution to a problem in linear elasticity provided by A. Flamant in 1892

== See also ==
- Flamand (disambiguation)
