= Michell solution =

Elasticity equation

In continuum mechanics, the Michell solution is a general solution to the elasticity equations in polar coordinates ($r, \theta$) developed by John Henry Michell in 1899. The solution is such that the stress components are in the form of a Fourier series in $\theta$.

Michell showed that the general solution can be expressed in terms of an Airy stress function of the form
$$\begin{align}
\varphi(r,\theta) &= A_0 r^2 + B_0 r^2 \ln(r) + C_0 \ln(r) \\
& + \left(I_0 r^2 + I_1 r^2 \ln(r) + I_2 \ln(r) + I_3 \right) \theta \\
& + \left(A_1 r + B_1 r^{-1} + B_1' r \theta + C_1 r^3 + D_1 r \ln(r)\right) \cos\theta \\
& + \left(E_1 r + F_1 r^{-1} + F_1' r \theta + G_1 r^3 + H_1 r \ln(r)\right) \sin\theta \\
& + \sum_{n=2}^{\infty} \left(A_n r^n + B_n r^{-n} + C_n r^{n+2} + D_n r^{-n+2}\right) \cos(n\theta) \\
& + \sum_{n=2}^{\infty} \left(E_n r^n + F_n r^{-n} + G_n r^{n+2} + H_n r^{-n+2}\right) \sin(n\theta)
\end{align}$$
The terms $A_1 r \cos\theta$ and $E_1 r \sin\theta$ define a trivial null state of stress and are ignored.

== Stress components ==
The stress components can be obtained by substituting the Michell solution into the equations for stress in terms of the Airy stress function (in cylindrical coordinates). A table of stress components is shown below.

$\varphi$	$\sigma_{rr}\,$	$\sigma_{r\theta}\,$	$\sigma_{\theta\theta}\,$
$r^2\,$	$2$	$0$	$2$
$r^2~\ln r$	$2~\ln r + 1$	$0$	$2~\ln r + 3$
$\ln r\,$	$r^{-2}\,$	$0$	$-r^{-2}\,$
$\theta\,$	$0$	$r^{-2}\,$	$0$
$r^3~\cos\theta \,$	$2~r~\cos\theta \,$	$2~r~\sin\theta \,$	$6~r~\cos\theta \,$
$r\theta~\cos\theta \,$	$-2~r^{-1}~\sin\theta \,$	$0$	$0$
$r~\ln r~\cos\theta \,$	$r^{-1}~\cos\theta \,$	$r^{-1}~\sin\theta \,$	$r^{-1}~\cos\theta \,$
$r^{-1}~\cos\theta \,$	$-2~r^{-3}~\cos\theta \,$	$-2~r^{-3}~\sin\theta \,$	$2~r^{-3}~\cos\theta \,$
$r^3~\sin\theta \,$	$2~r~\sin\theta \,$	$-2~r~\cos\theta \,$	$6~r~\sin\theta \,$
$r\theta~\sin\theta \,$	$2~r^{-1}~\cos\theta \,$	$0$	$0$
$r~\ln r~\sin\theta \,$	$r^{-1}~\sin\theta \,$	$-r^{-1}~\cos\theta \,$	$r^{-1}~\sin\theta \,$
$r^{-1}~\sin\theta \,$	$-2~r^{-3}~\sin\theta \,$	$2~r^{-3}~\cos\theta \,$	$2~r^{-3}~\sin\theta \,$
$r^{n+2}~\cos(n\theta) \,$	$-(n+1)(n-2)~r^n~\cos(n\theta) \,$	$n(n+1)~r^n~\sin(n\theta) \,$	$(n+1)(n+2)~r^n~\cos(n\theta) \,$
$r^{-n+2}~\cos(n\theta) \,$	$-(n+2)(n-1)~r^{-n}~\cos(n\theta) \,$	$-n(n-1)~r^{-n}~\sin(n\theta)\,$	$(n-1)(n-2)~r^{-n}~\cos(n\theta)$
$r^n~\cos(n\theta) \,$	$-n(n-1)~r^{n-2}~\cos(n\theta) \,$	$n(n-1)~r^{n-2}~\sin(n\theta) \,$	$n(n-1)~r^{n-2}~\cos(n\theta) \,$
$r^{-n}~\cos(n\theta) \,$	$-n(n+1)~r^{-n-2}~\cos(n\theta) \,$	$-n(n+1)~r^{-n-2}~\sin(n\theta) \,$	$n(n+1)~r^{-n-2}~\cos(n\theta) \,$
$r^{n+2}~\sin(n\theta) \,$	$-(n+1)(n-2)~r^n~\sin(n\theta) \,$	$-n(n+1)~r^n~\cos(n\theta) \,$	$(n+1)(n+2)~r^n~\sin(n\theta) \,$
$r^{-n+2}~\sin(n\theta) \,$	$-(n+2)(n-1)~r^{-n}~\sin(n\theta) \,$	$n(n-1)~r^{-n}~\cos(n\theta) \,$	$(n-1)(n-2)~r^{-n}~\sin(n\theta) \,$
$r^n~\sin(n\theta) \,$	$-n(n-1)~r^{n-2}~\sin(n\theta) \,$	$-n(n-1)~r^{n-2}~\cos(n\theta) \,$	$n(n-1)~r^{n-2}~\sin(n\theta) \,$
$r^{-n}~\sin(n\theta) \,$	$-n(n+1)~r^{-n-2}~\sin(n\theta) \,$	$n(n+1)~r^{-n-2}~\cos(n\theta) \,$	$n(n+1)~r^{-n-2}~\sin(n\theta) \,$

== Displacement components ==
Displacements $(u_r, u_\theta)$ can be obtained from the Michell solution by using the stress-strain and strain-displacement relations. A table of displacement components corresponding the terms in the Airy stress function for the Michell solution is given below. In this table

$$\kappa = \begin{cases}
3 - 4~\nu & \rm{for~plane~strain} \\
\cfrac{3 - \nu}{1 + \nu} & \rm{for~plane~stress} \\
\end{cases}$$

where $\nu$ is the Poisson's ratio, and $\mu$ is the shear modulus.

$\varphi$	$2~\mu~u_r\,$	$2~\mu~u_\theta\,$
$r^2\,$	$(\kappa-1)~r$	$0$
$r^2~\ln r$	$(\kappa-1)~r~\ln r - r$	$(\kappa + 1)~r~\theta$
$\ln r\,$	$-r^{-1}\,$	$0$
$\theta\,$	$0$	$-r^{-1}\,$
$r^3~\cos\theta \,$	$(\kappa-2)~r^2~\cos\theta \,$	$(\kappa+2)~r^2~\sin\theta \,$
$r\theta~\cos\theta \,$	$\frac{1}{2}[(\kappa-1) \theta~\cos\theta + \{1 - (\kappa+1) \ln r\} ~\sin\theta]\,$	$-\frac{1}{2}[(\kappa-1) \theta~\sin\theta + \{1 + (\kappa+1) \ln r\} ~\cos\theta]\,$
$r~\ln r~\cos\theta \,$	$\frac{1}{2}[(\kappa+1) \theta~\sin\theta - \{1 - (\kappa-1) \ln r\} ~\cos\theta] \,$	$\frac{1}{2}[(\kappa+1) \theta~\cos\theta - \{1 + (\kappa-1) \ln r\} ~\sin\theta] \,$
$r^{-1}~\cos\theta \,$	$r^{-2}~\cos\theta \,$	$r^{-2}~\sin\theta \,$
$r^3~\sin\theta \,$	$(\kappa-2)~r^2~\sin\theta \,$	$-(\kappa+2)~r^2~\cos\theta \,$
$r\theta~\sin\theta \,$	$\frac{1}{2}[(\kappa-1) \theta~\sin\theta - \{1 - (\kappa+1) \ln r\} ~\cos\theta]\,$	$\frac{1}{2}[(\kappa-1) \theta~\cos\theta - \{1 + (\kappa+1) \ln r\} ~\sin\theta]\,$
$r~\ln r~\sin\theta \,$	$-\frac{1}{2}[(\kappa+1) \theta~\cos\theta + \{1 - (\kappa-1) \ln r\} ~\sin\theta] \,$	$\frac{1}{2}[(\kappa+1) \theta~\sin\theta + \{1 + (\kappa-1) \ln r\} ~\cos\theta] \,$
$r^{-1}~\sin\theta \,$	$r^{-2}~\sin\theta \,$	$-r^{-2}~\cos\theta \,$
$r^{n+2}~\cos(n\theta) \,$	$(\kappa-n-1)~r^{n+1}~\cos(n\theta) \,$	$(\kappa+n+1)~r^{n+1}~\sin(n\theta) \,$
$r^{-n+2}~\cos(n\theta) \,$	$(\kappa+n-1)~r^{-n+1}~\cos(n\theta) \,$	$-(\kappa-n+1)~r^{-n+1}~\sin(n\theta)\,$
$r^n~\cos(n\theta) \,$	$-n~r^{n-1}~\cos(n\theta) \,$	$n~r^{n-1}~\sin(n\theta) \,$
$r^{-n}~\cos(n\theta) \,$	$n~r^{-n-1}~\cos(n\theta) \,$	$n~r^{-n-1}~\sin(n\theta) \,$
$r^{n+2}~\sin(n\theta) \,$	$(\kappa-n-1)~r^{n+1}~\sin(n\theta) \,$	$-(\kappa+n+1)~r^{n+1}~\cos(n\theta) \,$
$r^{-n+2}~\sin(n\theta) \,$	$(\kappa+n-1)~r^{-n+1}~\sin(n\theta) \,$	$(\kappa-n+1)~r^{-n+1}~\cos(n\theta)\,$
$r^n~\sin(n\theta) \,$	$-n~r^{n-1}~\sin(n\theta) \,$	$-n~r^{n-1}~\cos(n\theta) \,$
$r^{-n}~\sin(n\theta) \,$	$n~r^{-n-1}~\sin(n\theta) \,$	$-n~r^{-n-1}~\cos(n\theta) \,$

Note that a rigid body displacement can be superposed on the Michell solution of the form

$$\begin{align}
u_r &= A~\cos\theta + B~\sin\theta \\
u_\theta &= -A~\sin\theta + B~\cos\theta + C~r\\
\end{align}$$

to obtain an admissible displacement field.

== See also ==
- Linear elasticity
- Flamant solution
- John Henry Michell
