= Ludwig Prandtl =

German physicist (1875–1953)

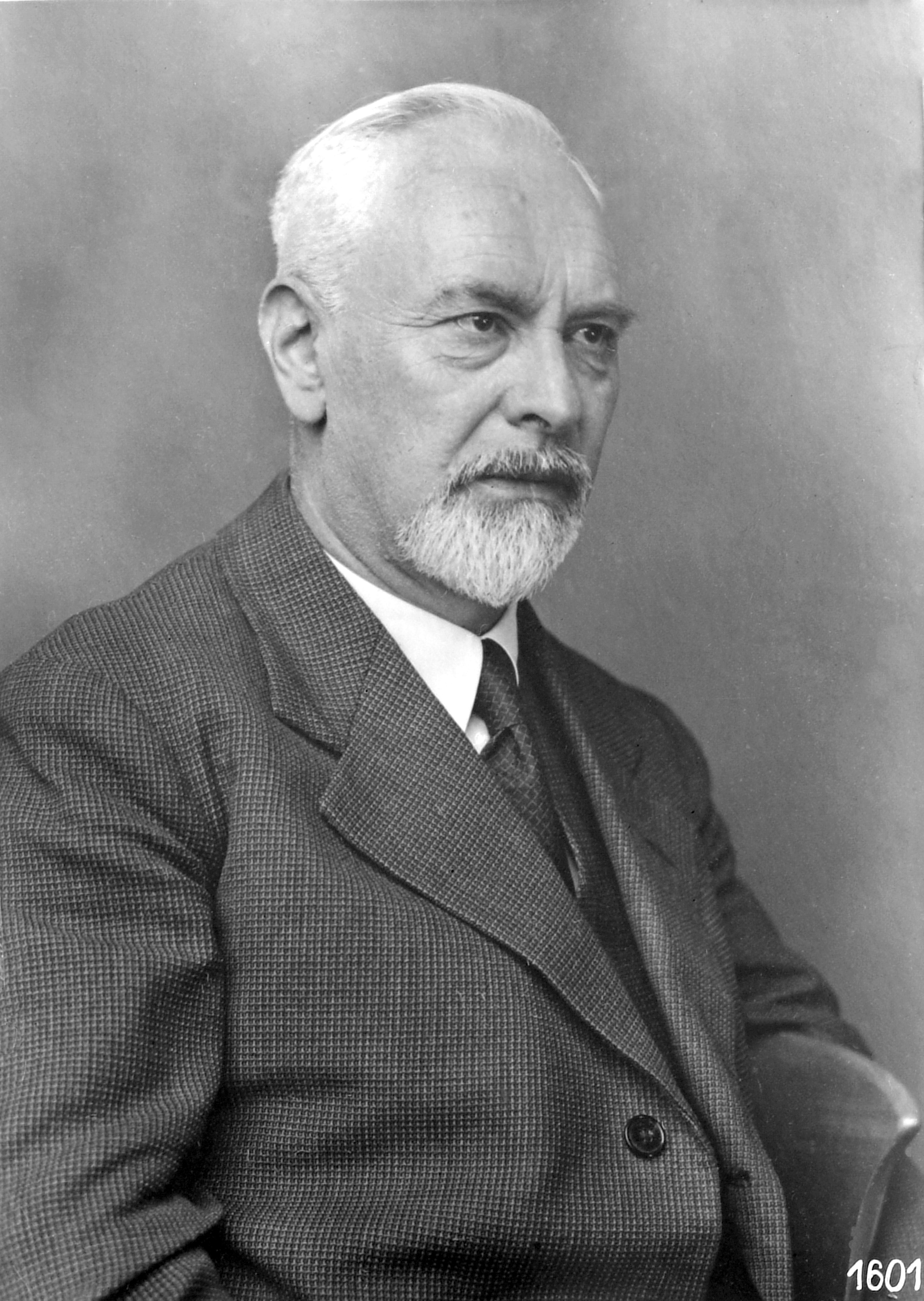
- Prandtl in 1937
- Born: 4 February 1875; Freising, Kingdom of Bavaria, German Empire
- Died: 15 August 1953 (aged 78); Göttingen, Lower Saxony, West Germany
- Education: Technical University of Munich; Ludwig-Maximilians-Universität München
- Known for: Boundary layer Mixing length theory Lifting-line theory Membrane analogy Prandtl box wing Prandtl condition Prandtl number Prandtl stress function Prandtl tube Prandtl's one-seventh-power law Prandtl–Meyer expansion fan Prandtl–Meyer function Prandtl–Batchelor theorem Prandtl–Glauert transformation Prandtl–Glauert singularity Prandtl–Tomlinson model Kármán–Prandtl resistance equation
- Awards: Ackermann–Teubner Memorial Award (1918); ForMemRS (1928); Daniel Guggenheim Medal (1930); Harnack Medal (1936); Wilhelm Exner Medal (1951)
- Scientific career
- Fields: Aerodynamics
- Workplaces: University of Göttingen, Technical University of Hannover
- Thesis: Tilting Phenomena, A case of unstable elastic balance (1899)
- Doctoral advisor: August Föppl
- Doctoral students: Ackeret, Blasius, Busemann, Munk, Nikuradse, Schlichting, Tollmien, von Kármán, Timoshenko, Vâlcovici, Vishnu Madav Ghatage

Ludwig Prandtl (German pronunciation: [ˈluːtvɪç ˈpʁantl̩]; 4 February 1875 – 15 August 1953) was a German fluid dynamicist, physicist and aerospace scientist. He was a pioneer in the development of rigorous systematic mathematical analyses which he used for underlying the science of aerodynamics, which have come to form the basis of the applied science of aeronautical engineering. In the 1920s, he developed the mathematical basis for the fundamental principles of subsonic aerodynamics in particular; and in general up to and including transonic velocities. His studies identified the boundary layer, thin-airfoils, and lifting-line theories. The Prandtl number was named after him.

== Early years ==
Prandtl was born in Freising, near Munich, on 4 February 1875. His mother suffered from a lengthy illness and, as a result, Ludwig spent more time with his father, a professor of engineering. His father also encouraged him to observe nature and think about his observations.

Prandtl entered the Technische Hochschule Munich in 1894 and graduated with a Ph.D. under guidance of Professor August Foeppl in six years. His thesis was "On Tilting Phenomena, an Example of Unstable Elastic Equilibrium" (1900).

After university, Prandtl went to work in the Maschinenfabrik Augsburg-Nürnberg to improve a suction device for shavings removal in the manufacturing process. While working there, he discovered that the suction tube did not work because the lines of flow separated from the walls of the tube, so the expected pressure rise in the sharply-divergent tube never occurred. This phenomenon had been previously noted by Daniel Bernoulli in a similar hydraulic case. Prandtl recalled that this discovery led to the reasoning behind his boundary-layer approach to resistance in slightly-viscous fluids.

== Later years ==
In 1901 Prandtl became a professor of fluid mechanics at the technical school in Hannover, later the Technical University Hannover and then the University of Hannover. It was here that he developed many of his most important theories. On 8 August 1904, he delivered a groundbreaking paper, Über Flüssigkeitsbewegung bei sehr kleiner Reibung (On the Motion of Fluids with Very Little Friction), at the Third International Mathematics Congress in Heidelberg. In this paper, he described the boundary layer and its importance for drag and streamlining. The paper also described flow separation as a result of the boundary layer, clearly explaining the concept of stall for the first time. Several of his students made attempts at closed-form solutions, but failed, and in the end the approximation contained in his original paper remains in widespread use.

The effect of the paper was so great that Prandtl would succeed Hans Lorenz as director of the Institute for Technical Physics at the University of Göttingen later in the year. In 1907, during his time at Göttingen, Prandtl was tasked with establishing a new facility for model studies of motorized airships called Motorluftschiffmodell-Versuchsanstalt (MVA), later the Aerodynamische Versuchsanstalt (AVA) in 1919. The facility was focused on wind tunnel measurements of airship models with the goal of shapes with minimal air resistance. During WWI, it was used as a large research establishment with many tasks including lift and drag on airfoils, aerodynamics of bombs, and cavitation on submarine propeller blades. In 1925, the university spun off his research arm to create the Kaiser Wilhelm Institute for Flow Research (now the Max Planck Institute for Dynamics and Self-Organization).

Due to the complexity of Prandtl's boundary layer ideas in his 1904 paper, the spread of the concept was initially slow. Many people failed to adopt the idea due to lack of understanding. There was a halt on new boundary layer discoveries until 1908 when two of his students at Gottingen, Blasius and Boltze, released their dissertations on the boundary layer. Blasius' dissertation explained what happened with the boundary layer when a flat plate comes in parallel contact with a uniform stream. Boltze's research was similar to Blasius' but applied Prandtl's theory to spherical shapes instead of flat objects. Prandtl expanded upon the ideas in his student's dissertations to include a thermal boundary layer associated with heat transfer.

There would be three more papers from Gottingen researchers regarding the boundary layer released by 1914. Due to similar reasons to Prandtl's 1904 paper, these first 7 papers on the boundary layer would be slow to spread outside of Gottingen. Partially due to World War I, there would be a lack of papers published regarding the boundary layer until another of Prandtl's students, Theodore Von Karman, published a paper in 1921 on the momentum integral equation across the boundary layer.

Following earlier leads by Frederick Lanchester from 1902–1907, Prandtl worked with Albert Betz and Max Munk on the problem of a useful mathematical tool for examining lift from "real world" wings. The results were published in 1918–1919, known as the Lanchester–Prandtl wing theory. He also made specific additions to study cambered airfoils, like those on World War I aircraft, and published a simplified thin-airfoil theory for these designs. This work led to the realization that on any wing of finite length, wing-tip effects became very important to the overall performance and characterization of the wing. Considerable work was included on the nature of induced drag and wingtip vortices, which had previously been ignored. Prandtl showed that an elliptical spanwise lift distribution is the most efficient, giving the minimum induced drag for the given span. These tools enabled aircraft designers to make meaningful theoretical studies of their aircraft before they were built.

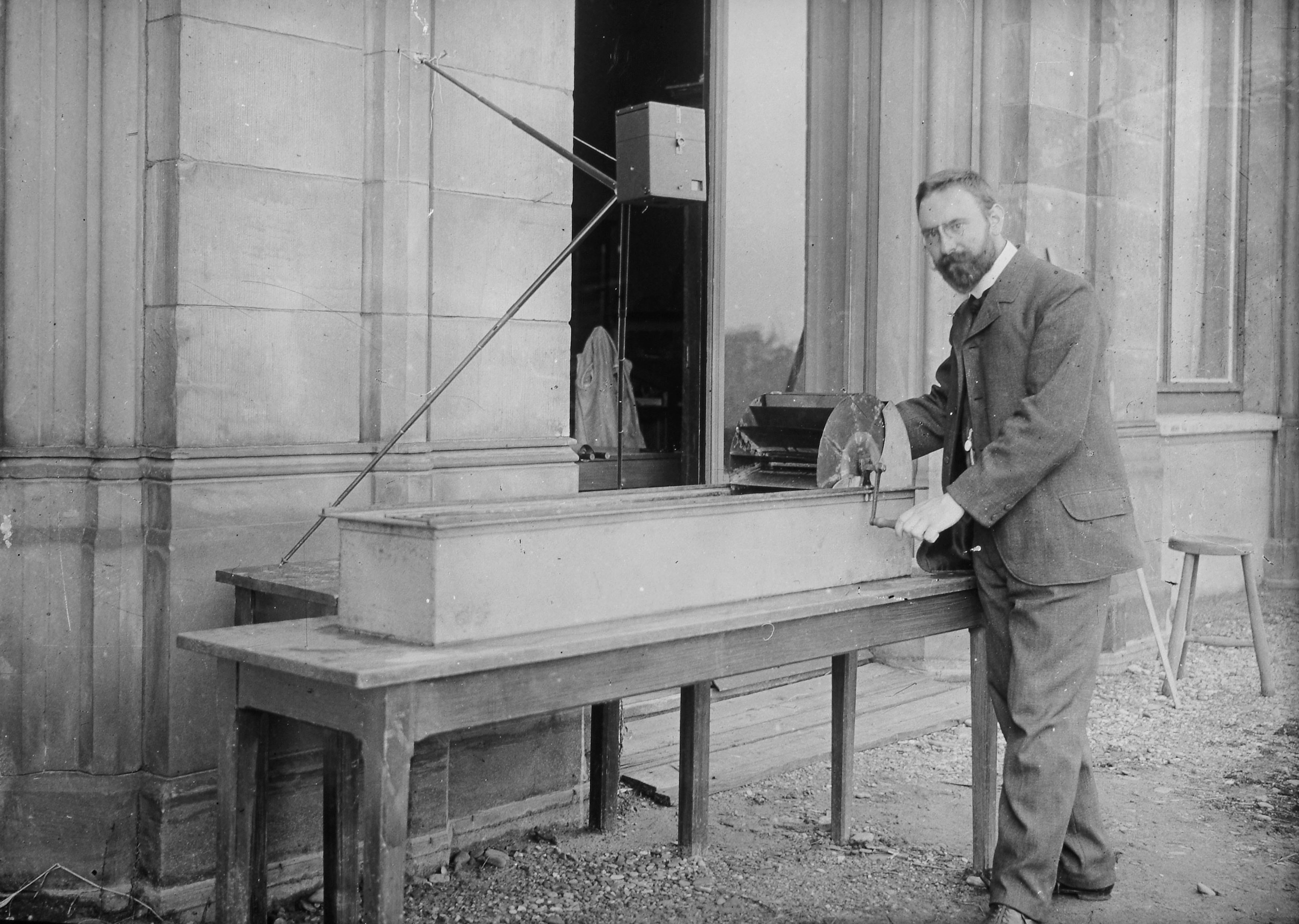
Ludwig Prandtl 1904 with his fluid test channel

Prandtl later extended his theory to describe a bell-like lift distribution, reducing the loads near the tip of the wings by washing out the wing tips until negative downwash was obtained, which gave the minimum induced drag for any given wing structural weight. However, this new lift distribution drew less interest than the elliptical distribution and was initially ignored in most practical aircraft designs. This concept has been rediscovered by other researchers and has become increasingly important (see also the Prandtl-D experimental aircraft).

Prandtl and his student Theodor Meyer developed the first theories of supersonic shock waves and flow in 1908. The Prandtl–Meyer expansion fans allowed for the construction of supersonic wind tunnels. He had little time to work on the problem further until the 1920s, when he worked with Adolf Busemann and created a method for designing a supersonic nozzle in 1929. Today, all supersonic wind tunnels and rocket nozzles are designed using the same method. A full development of supersonics would have to wait for the work of Theodore von Kármán, a student of Prandtl at Göttingen.

Prandtl developed the concept of "circulation" which proved to be particularly important for the hydrodynamics of ship propellers. He did most of the experimental work at his lab in Göttingen from 1910-1918 with his assistant Albert Betz and student Max Munk. Most of his discoveries related to circulation would be kept secret from the western world until after World War I.

Prior to World War I, the Society of German Natural Scientists and Physicians (GDNÄ) was the only opportunity for applied mathematicians, physicists, and engineers in German speaking countries to discuss. In 1920, they met in Bad Nauheim and came to the conclusion that there was a need for a new umbrella for applied sciences due to their experience during the war. In the same year, physicists primarily from industrial laboratories formed a new society called the German Physical Society (DGTP). In September 1921, the two societies held a meeting with the German Mathematical Society (DMV) in Jena. In its first volume, ZAMM (Journal of Applied Mathematics and Mechanics) stated that this meeting "for the first time, applied mathematics and mechanics was coming to its own to a larger extent" This journal advertised the common goals of Prandtl, Theodore von Kármán, Richard von Mises, and Hans Reissner.

On top of the foundation of ZAMM, the GAMM (International Association of Applied Mathematics and Mechanics) was also formed due to the joint efforts of Prandtl and his peers. After these initial meetings of GAMM, it became clear that there was now a new international community of mathematicians, "scientific engineers", and physicists.

Other work examined the problem of compressibility at high subsonic speeds, known as the Prandtl–Glauert correction. This became very useful during World War II as aircraft began approaching supersonic speeds for the first time. He also worked on meteorology, plasticity and structural mechanics. He also made significant contributions to the field of tribology.

Following Prandtl's investigation into instabilities from 1921-1929, he then moved to exploring developed turbulence. This was also being investigated by Kármán, resulting in a race to formulate a solution for the velocity profile in developed turbulence. Regarding the professional rivalry that started between the two, Kármán commented: "I came to realize that ever since I had come to Aachen my old professor and I were in a kind of world competition. The competition was gentlemanly, of course. But it was first-class rivalry nonetheless, a kind of Olympic games, between Prandtl and me, and beyond that between Göttingen and Aachen. The 'playing field' was the Congress of Applied Mechanics. Our 'ball' was the search for a universal law of turbulence." Around 1930, the race ended in a draw as both men concluded that the inverse square of skin friction was related to the logarithmic value of the product of Reynold's number and skin friction as seen below where k and C are constants.

Prandtl and von Kármán's work on the boundary was influential and adopted by aerodynamic and hydrodynamic experts around the world after WWI. In May 1932, the International Conference on Hydromechanical Problems of Ship Propulsion was held in Hamburg. Günther Kempf showcased a number of experiments at the conference which confirmed many of the theoretical discoveries of von Kármán and Prandtl.

== Prandtl and the Third Reich ==
After Hitler's rise to power and the establishment of the Third Reich, Prandtl continued his role as director of the Kaiser Wilhelm Society. During this period, the Nazi air ministry, led by Hermann Göring, often used Prandtl's international reputation as a scientist to promote Germany's scientific agenda. Prandtl appears to have happily served as an ambassador for the Nazi regime, writing in 1937 to a NACA representative "I believe that Fascism in Italy and National Socialism in Germany represent very good beginnings of new thinking and economics." Prandtl's support for the regime is apparent in his letters to G. I. Taylor and his wife in 1938 and 1939. Referring to Nazi Germany's treatment of Jews, Prandtl wrote "The struggle, which Germany unfortunately had to fight against the Jews, was necessary for its self-preservation." Prandtl also claimed that "If there will be war, the guilt to have caused it by political measures is this time unequivocally on the side of England."

As a member of the German Physical Society (DPG), Prandtl assisted Carl Ramsauer in drafting the DPG Petition in 1941. The DPG Petition would be published in 1942 and argued that physics in Germany was falling behind that of the United States due to rejection of "Jewish Physics" (relativity and quantum theory) from German physicists. After publication of the DPG Petition, the belief of "German Physics" superiority deteriorated to allow for German students to study these new fields in school.

== Publications ==
- Paul Peter Ewald, Theodor Pöschl, Ludwig Prandtl; authorized translation by J. Dougall and W.M. Deans The Physics of Solids and Fluids: With Recent Developments Blackie and Son (1930).
- Tietjens, Oskar Karl Gustav; Prandtl, Ludwig (1957). Fundamentals of Hydro- and Aeromechanics. Courier Corporation. ISBN 978-0-486-60374-2.
- Prandtl, Ludwig (1952). Essentials of fluid dynamics: With applications to hydraulics aeronautics, meteorology, and other subjects. Hafner. ISBN 9780028503301.

== Death and afterwards ==
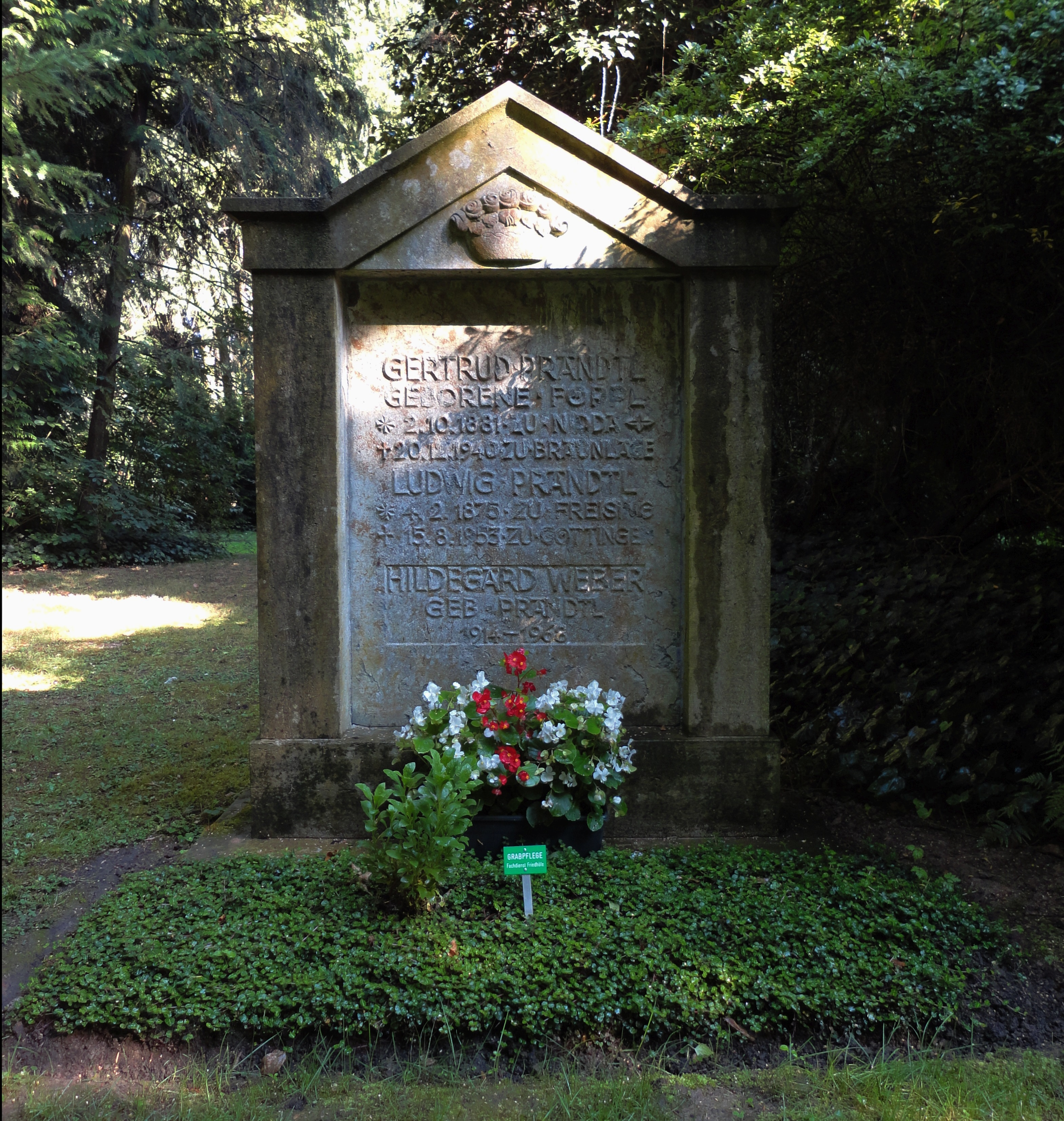
Göttingen, City Cemetery: Ludwig Prandtl's grave

Prandtl worked at Göttingen until he died on 15 August 1953. His work in fluid dynamics is still used today in many areas of aerodynamics and chemical engineering. He is often referred to as the father of modern aerodynamics.

The crater Prandtl on the far side of the Moon is named in his honor.

The Ludwig-Prandtl-Ring is awarded by Deutsche Gesellschaft für Luft- und Raumfahrt in his honor for outstanding contribution in the field of aerospace engineering.

In 1992, Prandtl was inducted into the International Air & Space Hall of Fame at the San Diego Air & Space Museum.

== Notable students ==
- Jakob Ackeret
- Albert Betz
- Paul Richard Heinrich Blasius
- Adolf Busemann
- Kurt Hohenemser
- Theodore von Kármán
- Lu Shijia (Hsiu-Chen Chang-Lu)
- Hubert Ludwieg
- Hilda M. Lyon (1932–33)
- Hans Multhopp
- Max Munk
- Johann Nikuradse
- Reinhold Rudenberg
- Hermann Schlichting
- Walter Tollmien
- Victor Vâlcovici
- Vishnu Madav Ghatage
- Karl Wieghardt
- Theodor Meyer

== See also ==
- Tesla turbine
- Particle image velocimetry
- Wind tunnel
- Subsonic and transonic wind tunnel
- Pitot tube
- Prandtl's one-seventh-power law
- NASA research aircraft, Prandtl-D (Preliminary Research Aerodynamic Design to Lower Drag) and Prandtl-M (Preliminary Research Aerodynamic Design to Land on Mars), both backronyms honoring Prandtl

Academic offices
New title	Director of Aerodynamic Laboratory; University of Göttingen; 1904–1936	Succeeded by Albert Betz
