= Flament =

Flament is a French surname. Notable people with the surname include:

- Didier Flament (born 1951), French fencer
- Flavie Flament (born 1974), French television and radio presenter
- Léon Flament (1906–?), Belgian rower
- Thibaud Flament (born 1997), French rugby union player

== See also ==
- Flamant (disambiguation)
