= Biharmonic equation =

Fourth-order PDE in continuum mechanics

In mathematics, the biharmonic equation is a fourth-order partial differential equation which arises in areas of continuum mechanics, including linear elasticity theory and the solution of Stokes flows. Specifically, it is used in the modeling of thin structures that react elastically to external forces.

== Notation ==
It is written as
$$\nabla^4 \varphi = 0$$
or
$$\nabla^2 \nabla^2 \varphi = 0$$
or
$$\Delta^2 \varphi = 0$$
where $\nabla^4$, which is the fourth power of the del operator and the square of the Laplacian operator $\nabla^2$ (or $\Delta$), is known as the biharmonic operator or the bilaplacian operator. In Cartesian coordinates, it can be written in $n$ dimensions as:
$$\nabla^4 \varphi = \sum_{i=1}^n\sum_{j=1}^n \partial_i\partial_i\partial_j\partial_j \varphi
= \left(\sum_{i=1}^n \partial_i\partial_i\right) \left(\sum_{j=1}^n \partial_j\partial_j\right) \varphi.$$
Because the formula here contains a summation of indices, many mathematicians prefer the notation $\Delta^2$ over $\nabla^4$ because the former makes clear which of the indices of the four nabla operators are contracted over.

For example, in three dimensional Cartesian coordinates the biharmonic equation has the form
$${\partial^4 \varphi\over \partial x^4 } +
{\partial^4 \varphi\over \partial y^4 } +
{\partial^4 \varphi\over \partial z^4 } +
2{\partial^4 \varphi\over \partial x^2\partial y^2} +
2{\partial^4 \varphi\over \partial y^2\partial z^2} +
2{\partial^4 \varphi\over \partial x^2\partial z^2} = 0.$$
As another example, in n-dimensional real coordinate space without the origin $\left( \mathbb{R}^n \setminus \mathbf 0 \right)$,
$$\nabla^4 \left({1\over r}\right) = {3(15-8n+n^2)\over r^5}$$
where
$$r = \sqrt{x_1^2 + x_2^2 +\cdots + x_n^2}.$$
which shows, for n=3 and n=5 only, $\frac{1}{r}$ is a solution to the biharmonic equation.

A solution to the biharmonic equation is called a biharmonic function. Any harmonic function is biharmonic, but the converse is not always true.

In two-dimensional polar coordinates, the biharmonic equation is
$$\frac{1}{r} \frac{\partial}{\partial r} \left(r \frac{\partial}{\partial r} \left(\frac{1}{r} \frac{\partial}{\partial r} \left(r \frac{\partial \varphi}{\partial r}\right) \right)\right)
+ \frac{2}{r^2} \frac{\partial^4 \varphi}{\partial \theta^2 \partial r^2}
+ \frac{1}{r^4} \frac{\partial^4 \varphi}{\partial \theta^4}
- \frac{2}{r^3} \frac{\partial^3 \varphi}{\partial \theta^2 \partial r}
+ \frac{4}{r^4} \frac{\partial^2 \varphi}{\partial \theta^2} = 0$$
which can be solved by separation of variables. The result is the Michell solution.

== 2-dimensional space ==
The general solution to the 2-dimensional case is
$$x v(x,y) - y u(x,y) + w(x,y)$$
where $u(x,y)$, $v(x,y)$ and $w(x,y)$ are harmonic functions and $v(x,y)$ is a harmonic conjugate of $u(x,y)$.

Just as harmonic functions in 2 variables are closely related to complex analytic functions, so are biharmonic functions in 2 variables. The general form of a biharmonic function in 2 variables can also be written as
$$\operatorname{Im}(\bar{z}f(z) + g(z))$$
where $f(z)$ and $g(z)$ are analytic functions.

== See also ==
- Harmonic function
