= Flamant solution =

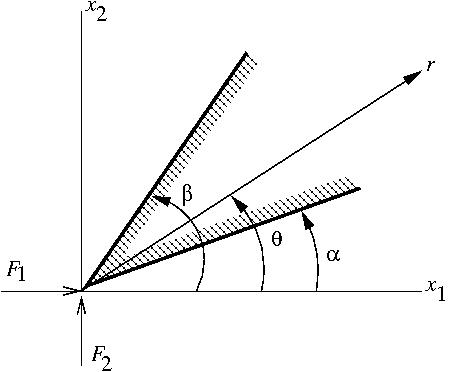
Elastic wedge loaded by two forces at the tip

In continuum mechanics, the Flamant solution provides expressions for the stresses and displacements in a linear elastic wedge loaded by point forces at its sharp end. This solution was developed by Alfred-Aimé Flamant in 1892 by modifying the three dimensional solutions for linear elasticity of Joseph Valentin Boussinesq.

The stresses predicted by the Flamant solution are (in polar coordinates)

$$\begin{align}
\sigma_{rr} & = \frac{2C_1\cos\theta}{r} + \frac{2C_3\sin\theta}{r} \\
\sigma_{r\theta} & = 0 \\
\sigma_{\theta\theta} & = 0
\end{align}$$

where $C_1, C_3$ are constants that are determined from the boundary conditions and the geometry of the wedge (i.e., the angles $\alpha,\beta$) and satisfy

$$\begin{align}
F_1 & + 2\int_{\alpha}^{\beta}
(C_1\cos\theta + C_3\sin\theta)\,\cos\theta\, d\theta = 0 \\
F_2 & + 2\int_{\alpha}^{\beta}
(C_1\cos\theta + C_3\sin\theta)\,\sin\theta\, d\theta = 0
\end{align}$$

where $F_1,F_2$ are the applied forces.

The wedge problem is self-similar and has no inherent length scale. Also, all quantities can be expressed in the separated-variable form $\sigma = f(r)g(\theta)$. The stresses vary as $(1/r)$.

== Forces acting on a half-plane ==
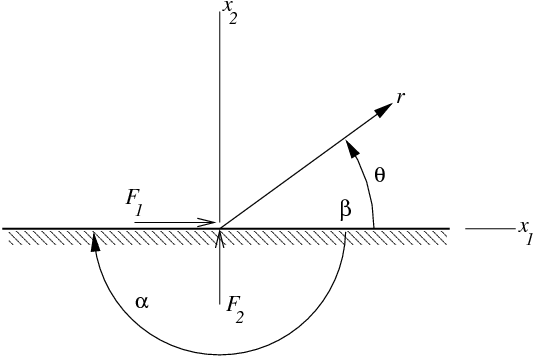
Elastic half-plane loaded by two point forces.

For the special case where $\alpha = -\pi$, $\beta = 0$, the wedge is converted into a half-plane with a normal force and a tangential force. In that case

$$C_1 = - \frac{F_1}{\pi},\quad C_3 = -\frac{F_2}{\pi}$$

Therefore, the stresses are

$$\begin{align}
\sigma_{rr} & = -\frac{2}{\pi\,r} (F_1\cos\theta + F_2\sin\theta) \\
\sigma_{r\theta} & = 0 \\
\sigma_{\theta\theta} & = 0
\end{align}$$

and the displacements are (using Michell's solution)

$$\begin{align}
u_r & = -\cfrac{1}{4\pi\mu}\left[F_1\{(\kappa-1)\theta\sin\theta - \cos\theta + (\kappa+1)\ln  r\cos\theta\} + \right. \\
& \qquad \qquad \left. F_2\{(\kappa-1)\theta\cos\theta + \sin\theta - (\kappa+1)\ln r\sin\theta\}\right]\\
u_\theta & = -\cfrac{1}{4\pi\mu}\left[F_1\{(\kappa-1)\theta\cos\theta - \sin\theta - (\kappa+1)\ln  r\sin\theta\} - \right. \\
& \qquad \qquad \left. F_2\{(\kappa-1)\theta\sin\theta + \cos\theta + (\kappa+1)\ln r\cos\theta\}\right]
\end{align}$$

The $\ln r$ dependence of the displacements implies that the displacement grows the further one moves from the point of application of the force (and is unbounded at infinity). This feature of the Flamant solution is confusing and appears unphysical.

=== Displacements at the surface of the half-plane ===
The displacements in the $x_1, x_2$ directions at the surface of the half-plane are given by

$$\begin{align}
u_1 & = \frac{F_1(\kappa+1)\ln|x_1|}{4\pi\mu} +
\frac{F_2(\kappa-1)\text{sign}(x_1)}{8\mu} \\
u_2 & = \frac{F_2(\kappa+1)\ln|x_1|}{4\pi\mu} +
\frac{F_1(\kappa-1)\text{sign}(x_1)}{8\mu}
\end{align}$$

where

$$\kappa = \begin{cases} 3 - 4\nu & \qquad \text{plane strain} \\
\cfrac{3 - \nu}{1+\nu} & \qquad \text{plane stress} \end{cases}$$

$\nu$ is the Poisson's ratio, $\mu$ is the shear modulus, and

$$\text{sign}(x) = \begin{cases}
+1 & x > 0 \\
-1 & x < 0
\end{cases}$$

== Derivation ==
If we assume the stresses to vary as $(1/r)$, we can pick terms containing $1/r$ in the stresses from Michell's solution. Then the Airy stress function can be expressed as

$$\varphi = C_1 r \theta\sin\theta + C_2 r\ln r \cos\theta +
C_3 r \theta\cos\theta + C_4 r\ln r \sin\theta$$

Therefore, from the tables in Michell's solution, we have

$$\begin{align}
\sigma_{rr} & = C_1\left(\frac{2\cos\theta}{r}\right) +
C_2\left(\frac{\cos\theta}{r}\right) +
C_3\left(\frac{2\sin\theta}{r}\right) +
C_4\left(\frac{\sin\theta}{r}\right) \\
\sigma_{r\theta} & = C_2\left(\frac{\sin\theta}{r}\right) +
C_4\left(\frac{-\cos\theta}{r}\right) \\
\sigma_{\theta\theta} & = C_2\left(\frac{\cos\theta}{r}\right) +
C_4\left(\frac{\sin\theta}{r}\right)
\end{align}$$

The constants $C_1, C_2, C_3, C_4$ can then, in principle, be determined from the wedge geometry and the applied boundary conditions.

However, the concentrated loads at the vertex are difficult to express in terms of traction boundary conditions because

1. the unit outward normal at the vertex is undefined
2. the forces are applied at a point (which has zero area) and hence the traction at that point is infinite.

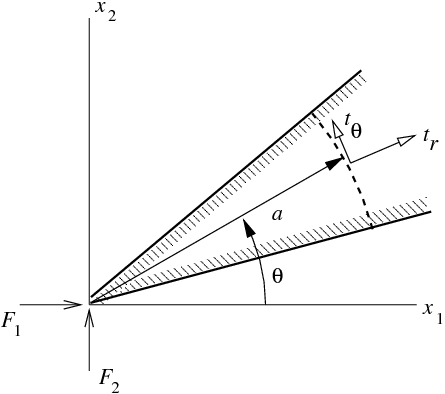
Bounded elastic wedge for equilibrium of forces and moments.

To get around this problem, we consider a bounded region of the wedge and consider equilibrium of the bounded wedge. Let the bounded wedge have two traction free surfaces and a third surface in the form of an arc of a circle with radius $a\,$. Along the arc of the circle, the unit outward normal is $\mathbf{n} = \mathbf{e}_r$ where the basis vectors are $(\mathbf{e}_r, \mathbf{e}_\theta)$. The tractions on the arc are

$$\mathbf{t} = \boldsymbol{\sigma}\cdot\mathbf{n} \quad \implies t_r = \sigma_{rr}, ~ t_\theta = \sigma_{r\theta} ~.$$

Next, we examine the force and moment equilibrium in the bounded wedge and get

$$\begin{align}
\sum f_1 & = F_1 + \int_{\alpha}^{\beta} \left[\sigma_{rr}(a,\theta)~\cos\theta
- \sigma_{r\theta}(a,\theta)~\sin\theta\right]~a~d\theta = 0 \\
\sum f_2 & = F_2 + \int_{\alpha}^{\beta} \left[\sigma_{rr}(a,\theta)~\sin\theta
+ \sigma_{r\theta}(a,\theta)~\cos\theta\right]~a~d\theta = 0 \\
\sum m_3 & = \int_{\alpha}^{\beta} \left[a~\sigma_{r\theta}(a,\theta)\right]~a~d\theta = 0
\end{align}$$

We require that these equations be satisfied for all values of $a\,$ and thereby satisfy the boundary conditions.

The traction-free boundary conditions on the edges $\theta=\alpha$ and $\theta=\beta$ also imply that

$$\sigma_{r\theta} = \sigma_{\theta\theta} = 0 \qquad \text{at}~~\theta=\alpha, \theta=\beta$$

except at the point $r = 0$.

If we assume that $\sigma_{r\theta}=0$ everywhere, then the traction-free conditions and the moment equilibrium equation are satisfied and we are left with

$$\begin{align}
F_1 & + \int_{\alpha}^{\beta} \sigma_{rr}(a,\theta)~a~\cos\theta
~d\theta = 0 \\
F_2 & + \int_{\alpha}^{\beta} \sigma_{rr}(a,\theta)~a~\sin\theta
~d\theta = 0
\end{align}$$

and $\sigma_{\theta\theta} = 0$ along $\theta=\alpha, \theta=\beta$ except at the point $r = 0$. But the field $\sigma_{\theta\theta} = 0$ everywhere also satisfies the force equilibrium equations. Hence this must be the solution. Also, the assumption $\sigma_{r\theta}=0$ implies that $C_2 = C_4 = 0$.

Therefore,

$$\sigma_{rr} = \frac{2C_1\cos\theta}{r} + \frac{2C_3\sin\theta}{r} ~;~~
\sigma_{r\theta} = 0 ~;~~ \sigma_{\theta\theta} = 0$$

To find a particular solution for $\sigma_{rr}$ we have to plug in the expression for $\sigma_{rr}$ into the force equilibrium equations to get a system of two equations which have to be solved for $C_1, C_3$:

$$\begin{align}
F_1 & + 2\int_{\alpha}^{\beta}
(C_1\cos\theta + C_3\sin\theta)~\cos\theta~ d\theta = 0 \\
F_2 & + 2\int_{\alpha}^{\beta}
(C_1\cos\theta + C_3\sin\theta)~\sin\theta~ d\theta = 0
\end{align}$$

=== Forces acting on a half-plane ===
If we take $\alpha = -\pi$ and $\beta = 0$, the problem is converted into one where a normal force $F_2$ and a tangential force $F_1$ act on a half-plane. In that case, the force equilibrium equations take the form

$$\begin{align}
F_1 & + 2\int_{-\pi}^{0}
(C_1\cos\theta + C_3\sin\theta)~\cos\theta~ d\theta = 0 \qquad \implies F_1 + C_1\pi = 0\\
F_2 & + 2\int_{-\pi}^{0}
(C_1\cos\theta + C_3\sin\theta)~\sin\theta~ d\theta = 0 \qquad \implies F_2 + C_3\pi = 0
\end{align}$$

Therefore

$$C_1 = - \cfrac{F_1}{\pi} ~;~~  C_3 = - \cfrac{F_2}{\pi} ~.$$

The stresses for this situation are

$$\sigma_{rr} = -\frac{2}{\pi r}(F_1\cos\theta + F_2\sin\theta) ~;~~
\sigma_{r\theta} = 0 ~;~~ \sigma_{\theta\theta} = 0$$

Using the displacement tables from the Michell solution, the displacements for this case are given by

$$\begin{align}
u_r & = -\cfrac{1}{4\pi\mu}\left[F_1\{(\kappa-1)\theta\sin\theta - \cos\theta + (\kappa+1)\ln  r\cos\theta\} + \right. \\
& \qquad \qquad \left. F_2\{(\kappa-1)\theta\cos\theta + \sin\theta - (\kappa+1)\ln r\sin\theta\}\right]\\
u_\theta & = -\cfrac{1}{4\pi\mu}\left[F_1\{(\kappa-1)\theta\cos\theta - \sin\theta - (\kappa+1)\ln  r\sin\theta\} - \right. \\
& \qquad \qquad \left. F_2\{(\kappa-1)\theta\sin\theta + \cos\theta + (\kappa+1)\ln r\cos\theta\}\right]
\end{align}$$

==== Displacements at the surface of the half-plane ====
To find expressions for the displacements at the surface of the half plane, we first find the displacements for positive $x_1$ ($\theta=0$) and negative $x_1$ ($\theta = \pi$) keeping in mind that $r = |x_1|$ along these locations.

For $\theta=0$ we have

$$\begin{align}
u_r = u_1 & = \cfrac{F_1}{4\pi\mu}\left[1 - (\kappa+1)\ln  |x_1|\right] \\
u_\theta = u_2 & = \cfrac{F_2}{4\pi\mu}\left[1 + (\kappa+1)\ln |x_1|\right]
\end{align}$$

For $\theta = \pi$ we have

$$\begin{align}
u_r = -u_1 & = -\cfrac{F_1}{4\pi\mu}\left[1 - (\kappa+1)\ln  |x_1|\right] +
\cfrac{F_2}{4\mu}(\kappa-1)\\
u_\theta = -u_2 & = \cfrac{F_1}{4\mu}(\kappa-1) -
\cfrac{F_2}{4\pi\mu}\left[1 + (\kappa+1)\ln |x_1|\right]
\end{align}$$

We can make the displacements symmetric around the point of application of the force by adding rigid body displacements (which does not affect the stresses)

$$u_1 = \cfrac{F_2}{8\mu}(\kappa-1) ~;~~ u_2 = \cfrac{F_1}{8\mu}(\kappa-1)$$

and removing the redundant rigid body displacements

$$u_1 = \cfrac{F_1}{4\pi\mu} ~;~~ u_2 = \cfrac{F_2}{4\pi\mu} ~.$$

Then the displacements at the surface can be combined and take the form

$$\begin{align}
u_1 & = \cfrac{F_1}{4\pi\mu}(\kappa+1)\ln |x_1| + \cfrac{F_2}{8\mu}(\kappa-1)\text{sign}(x_1)  \\
u_2 & = \cfrac{F_2}{4\pi\mu}(\kappa+1)\ln |x_1| +\cfrac{F_1}{8\mu}(\kappa-1)\text{sign}(x_1)
\end{align}$$

where

$$\text{sign}(x) = \begin{cases}
+1 & x > 0 \\
-1 & x < 0
\end{cases}$$
