= Flamand =

Flamand may refer to:

- The French term for Flemish (disambiguation)
- Flemish Movement (French: Mouvement Flamand), the political movement for emancipation and greater autonomy of the Belgian region of Flanders

== Toponymy ==
- Flamand River, a river in Quebec, Canada
- Little Flamand River, river in Quebec, Canada

== People with the surname ==
- Antonio Flamand (born 1933), Québécois politician, in Canada
- Didier Flamand (born 1947), actor, writer and French director
- Firmin Flamand, Belgian archer
- Frédéric Flamand (born 1946), director and Belgian choreographer
- Paul Flamand (1909–1998), French publisher and owner of Éditions du Seuil
- Thierry Flamand (born 1953), French illustrator and designer for theater and film, nominated in 2007 for César Award for Best Production Design

== See also ==
- Flamant (disambiguation)
