= Prandtl condition =

In fluid mechanics the Prandtl condition was suggested by the German physicist Ludwig Prandtl to identify possible boundary layer separation points of incompressible fluid flows.

== Prandtl condition-in normal shock ==
In the case of normal shock, flow is assumed to be in a steady state and thickness of shock is very small. It is further assumed that there is no friction or heat loss at the shock (because heat transfer is negligible because it occurs on a relatively small surface). It is customary in this field to denote x as the upstream and y as the downstream condition. Since the mass flow rate from the two sides of the shock are constant, the mass balance becomes,

$\rho_{x}.U_{x}=\rho_{y}.U_{y}$

As there is no external force applied, momentum is conserved. Which give rises to the equation

$P_{x}-P_{y}=\rho_{x}.{U_{x}}^2-\rho_{y}.{U_{y}}^2$

Because heat flow is negligible, the process can be treated as adiabatic. So the energy equation will be

$C_{p}.T_{x}+\frac{{U_{x}}^2}{2}=C_{p}.T_{y}+\frac{{U_{y}}^2}{2}$

From the equation of state for perfect gas, $P=\rho R T$

As the temperature from both sides of the shock wave is discontinuous, the speed of sound is different in these adjoining medium. So it is convenient to define the star mach number that will be independent of the specific mach number. From star condition, the speed of sound at the critical condition can also be a good reference velocity. Speed of sound at that temperature is,

$c^* = \sqrt{kRT^*}$

And additional Mach number which is independent of specific mach number is,

$M^* = \frac{U}{c^*} =\frac{cM}{c^*}$

Since energy remains constant across the shock,

$\frac{c^2}{k-1}+\frac{U^2}{2} = \frac{{c^*}^{2}}{k-1}+\frac{{c^*}^{2}}{2} =\frac{(k+1){c^*}^{2}}{2(k-1)}$

dividing mass equation by momentum equation we will get

$\frac{{c_{1}}^2}{kU_{1}}+U_{1}=\frac{{c_{2}}^2}{kU_{2}}+U_{2}$

From above equations,

$\frac{1}{kU_{1}}\left[\frac{(k+1){c^*}^{2}}{2}-\frac{(k-1){U_{1}}^2}{2}\right]+U_{1} = \frac{1}{kU_{2}}\left[\frac{(k+1){c^*}^{2}}{2}-\frac{(k-1){U_{2}}^2}{2}\right]+U_{2}$

it will give rises to

$U_{1}.U_{2} = {a^*}^2$

Which is called the prandtl condition in normal shock
