= Prandtl-D =

Series of unmanned experimental glider-aircraft

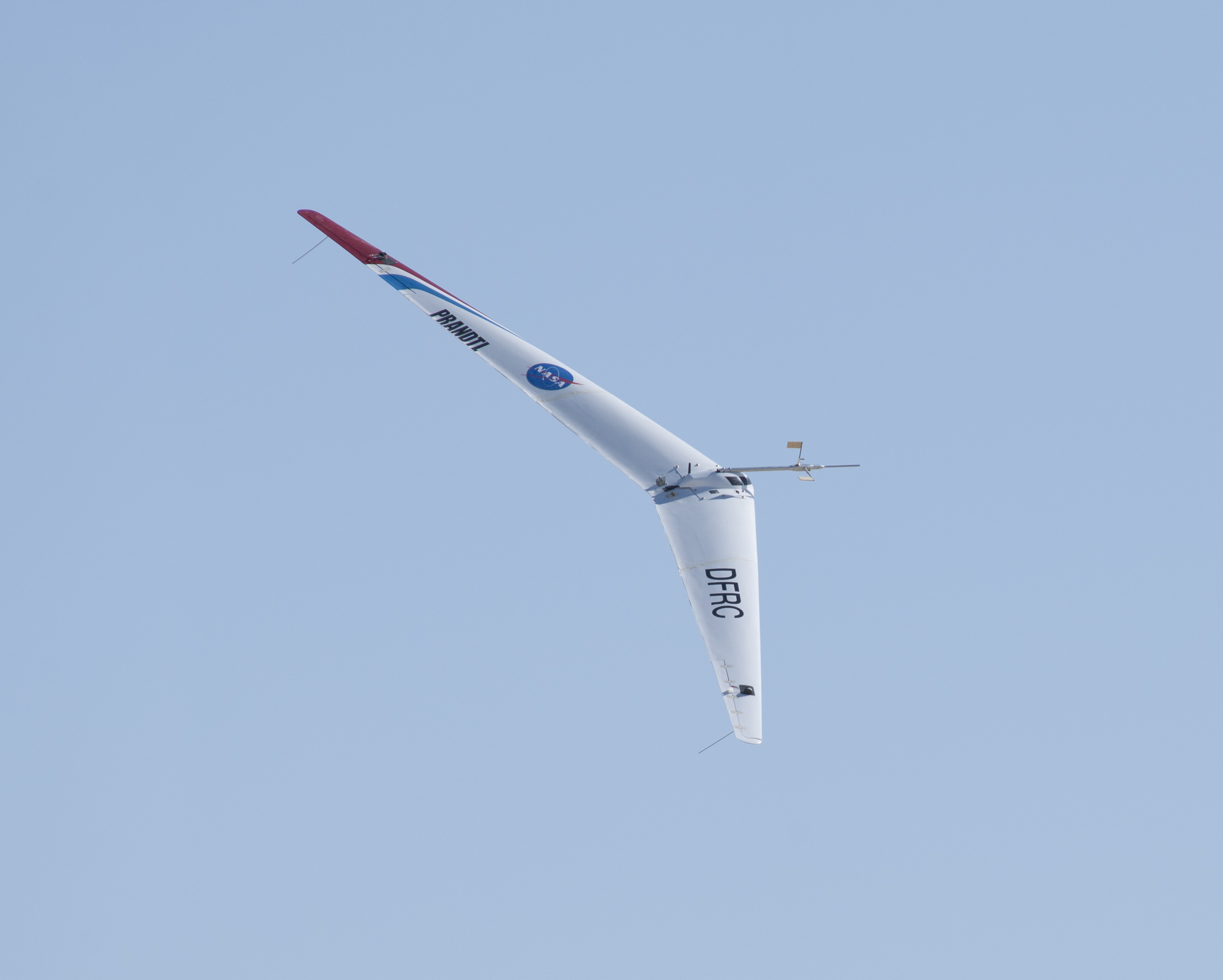

General information
- Type: Experimental Glider
- National origin: United States
- Primary user: NASA

History
- First flight: October 28, 2015

Project badge

The Preliminary Research Aerodynamic Design to Lower Drag, or Prandtl-D was a series of unmanned experimental glider-aircraft developed by NASA under aerodynamicist Albion Bowers. The acronym is a reference to early German Aerospace Engineer Ludwig Prandtl, whose theory of the bell-shaped lift distribution deeply influenced Bowers.

The Prandtl-D1 and the Prandtl-D3 models are preserved in the National Air and Space Museum and the California Science Center, respectively.

== Origins ==
The Prandtl-D design intended to minimise drag and thus maximise aerodynamic efficiency, while remaining stable and controllable. It was inspired by the flight of birds, which turn and bank without the vertical tails that are required for such maneuvers on traditional aircraft. It was intended to provide for future experimental low drag and aircraft designs, which previously have had issues of controllability. The program built on theoretical wing studies by Ludwig Prandtl in the early 1930s. The Prandtl-D's designs also drew on glider concepts of the German Horten brothers Reimar and Walter, and incorporate the conclusions of NASA aerodynamics pioneers R.T. Jones and Richard T. Whitcomb.

Albion Bowers, NASA Armstrong chief scientist and Prandtl-D project manager, brought together these theories and led the project, with help from student interns. He believes that with the concepts proven under the Prandtl-D "the time may be coming for a new paradigm in aviation."

== Design ==
A tailless flying wing configuration was selected, as it offers the most potential for reducing drag and obtaining high aerodynamic efficiency. Sweeping the wing back also offers the opportunity to ensure stability and controllability, without unduly affecting efficiency.

The first two subscale Prandtl-D aircraft had a 12.5-foot wingspan and were constructed of a machined foam core wrapped in a skin of carbon fiber. The Prandtl-D No.3 has a wingspan of 25 ft, weight of 28 lbs, top airspeed of 18 kt, and a maximum altitude of 220 ft. The aircraft also has the Arduino flight control system used in the second Prandtl-D subscale model and is constructed of carbon fiber, fiberglass and foam. A key difference in the Prandtl-D full scale model is an addition of a University of Minnesota developed Data Collection System (DAC).

In March 2016, Bowers published a technical paper entitled, "On Wings of the Minimum Induced Drag: Spanload Implications for Aircraft and Birds," NASA/TP – 2016-219072. Detailing the aerodynamic properties and mathematics associated with the project, Bowers discusses in depth the science behind altering the span load distribution on aircraft wings and the data gathered from experiments that demonstrated validation of its critical principles.

== Development ==
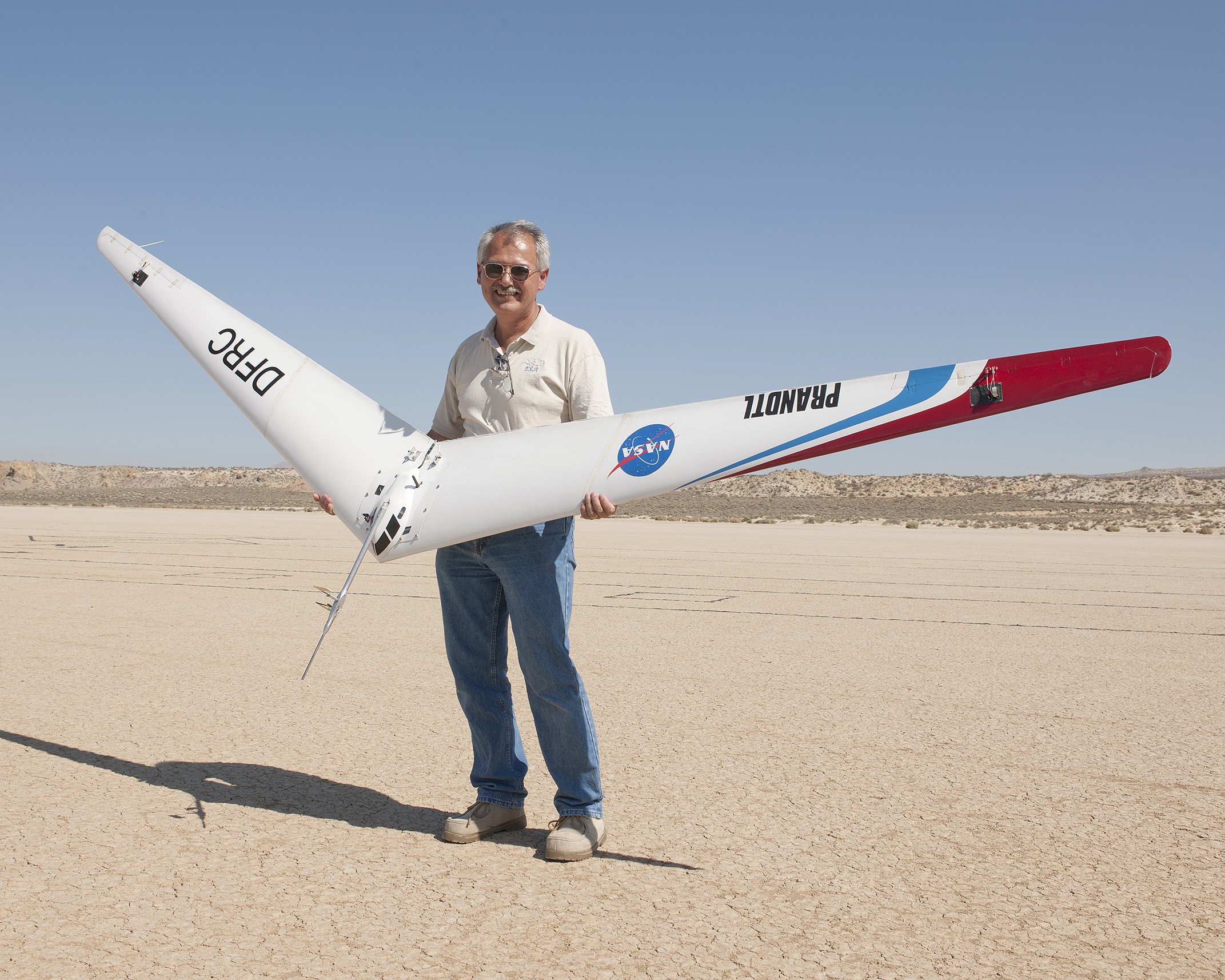
Project manager Al Bowers with PRANDTL-D No. 2

The first full sized model of these to fly was designated "Prandtl-D No. 3", and flown in a series of tests on October 28, 2015 at the Armstrong Flight Research Center in Edwards, California. The aircraft is centered around the testing of yawing without a vertical stabilizer. The manager of the project, Albion Bowers, said that the aircraft is based on the flight of a bird.

The Prandtl-D No. 3 first flew Oct. 28, 2015, with double the wingspan of the earlier versions, however, through development, the team managed to reduce the final glider's drag by 11%.

Initially, each aircraft was radio operated with a hobby-grade controller and launched with a bungee cord system. Later flight tests switched from a bungee launch method to a towed launch system.

The first two vehicles of the program showed twist of the airfoil in providing a bell-shaped lift distribution instead of the elliptical distribution. This feature gave an efficiency boost and reduced strain on the wings.

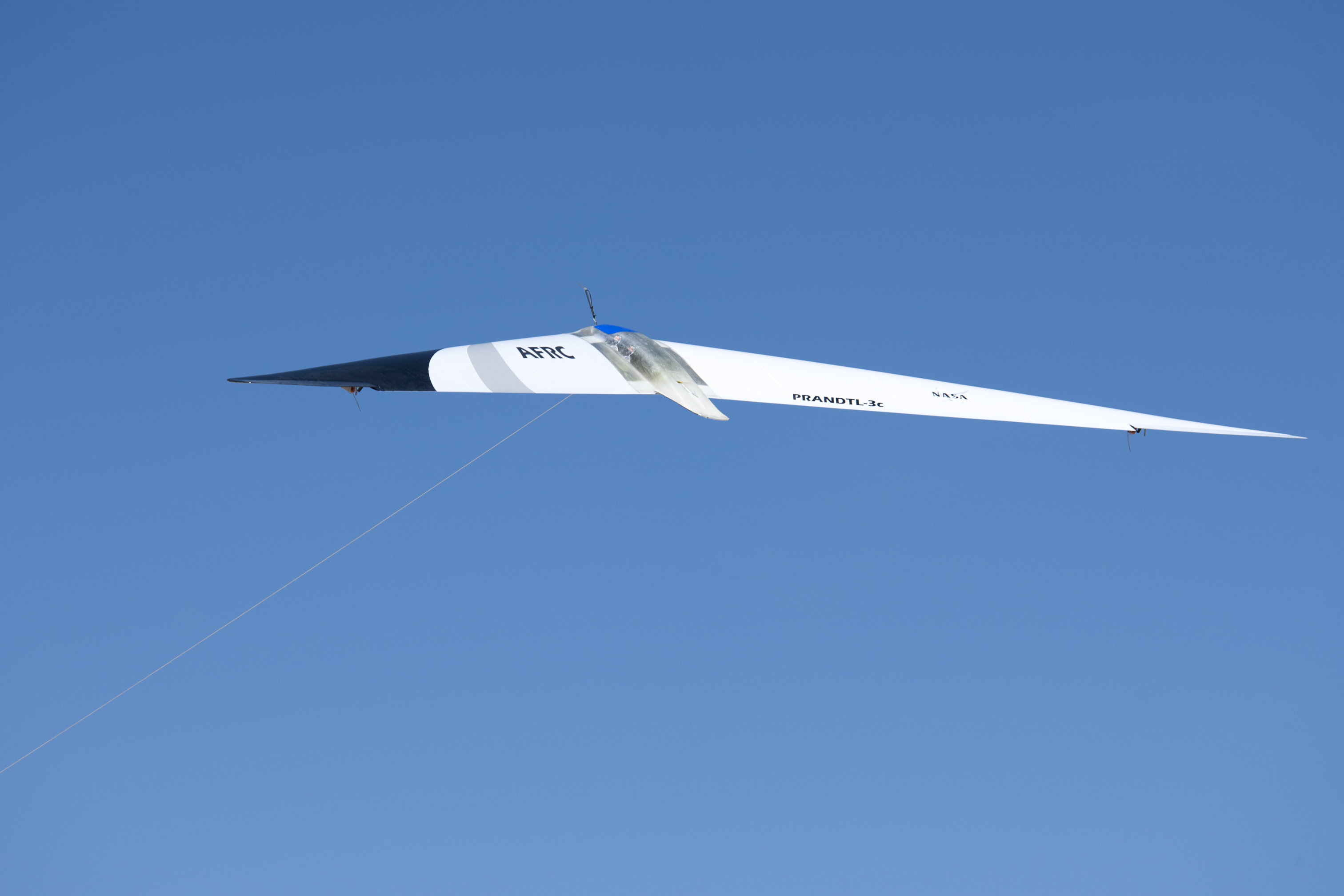
Later iteration of the vehicle using the bungee launch system

== Derivative designs ==
The Prandtl-D led to the Preliminary Research Aerodynamic Design to Land on Mars (Prandtl-M) program designed for Mars Exploration. It has been tested in upper atmosphere of Earth and is designed to take topographic photos of the Martian surface.

It also has provided a valuable platform for the Weather Hazard Alert and Awareness Technology Radiation Radiosonde Glider (WHAATRR) that will be used for atmospheric weather testing on Earth.

== Surviving aircraft ==
In 2019, two of the aircraft, D1 and D3, were transferred to the Smithsonian National Air and Space Museum in Washington, D.C., and California Science Center, Los Angeles, respectively, for their display following a successful review of the program. The Smithsonian specifically requested the aircraft because of its innovative proverse-yaw design.

== Variants ==
Four examples and two derivative designs were built; all were unpowered gliders.

- Prandtl-D1
- Prandtl-D2
- Prandtl-D3
- Prandtl-D3c
- Prandtl-M: Mars atmospheric aircraft test vehicle, derived from the Prandtl-D series.
- WHAATRR: Weather Hazard Alert and Awareness Technology Radiation Radiosonde, derived from the Prandtl-M.
