= John Henry Michell =

Australian mathematician

John Henry Michell FRS (26 October 1863 – 3 February 1940) was an Australian mathematician and professor of mathematics at the University of Melbourne.

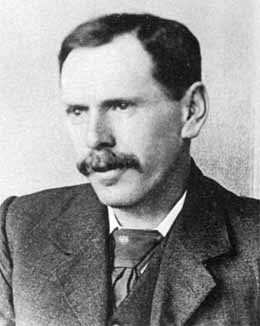
Australian mathematician and professor John Henry Michell

== Early life ==
Michell was the son of John Michell (pronounced Mitchell), a miner, and his wife Grace (née Rowse), and was born in Maldon, Victoria. His parents had migrated from Devonshire in 1854.

== Legacy ==
During a relatively short research career, Michell published 23 scientific papers that are some of the most important contributions ever made by an Australian mathematician. A mini-symposium was held at the 3rd Biennial Engineering Mathematics and Applications Conference (EMAC '98) celebrating the centenary of the publication of Michell's famous 1898 paper on ship hydrodynamics, "The wave resistance of a ship", Phil. Mag. (5) 45 (1898) 106-123.

Since 1999, The JH Michell Medal has been awarded by ANZIAM in his honor.

The University of Melbourne has named a theatre in his honour,

== Publications of J.H. Michell ==
1. The small deformation of curves and surfaces with applications to the vibrations of a helix and a circular ring, Messeng. Math. 19, (1890) 68-82.
2. On the exhaustion of Neumann's mode of solution for the motion of solids of revolution in liquids, and similar problems, Messeng. Math. 19 (1890) 83-86.
3. Vibrations of a string stretched on a surface, Messeng. Math. 19 (1890) 87-88.
4. On the stability of a bent and twisted wire, Messeng. Math. 19 (1890) 181-184.
5. On the theory of free stream lines, Phil. Trans. A. 181 (1890) 389-431.
6. On a property of algebraic curves, Australasian Assoc. Adv. Sci. Report (1892) 257.
7. On the bulging of flat plates, Australasian Assoc. Adv. Sci. Report (1892) 258.
8. The highest waves in water, Phil. Mag. (5) 36 (1893) 430-437.
9. A map of the complex Z-function: a condenser problem, Messeng. Math. 23 (1894) 72-78.
10. The wave resistance of a ship, Phil. Mag. (5) 45 (1898) 106-123.
11. On the direct determination of stress in an elastic solid, with application to the theory of plates, Proc. Lond. Math. Soc. 31 (1899) 100-124.
12. The stress in a rotating lamina, Proc. Lond. Math. Soc. 31 (1899) 124-130.
13. The uniform torsion and flexure of incomplete tores, with application to helical springs, Proc. Lond. Math. Soc. 31 (1899) 130-146.
14. The transmission of stress across a plane of discontinuity in an isotropic elastic solid, and the potential solutions for a plane boundary, Proc. Lond. Math. Soc. 31 (1899) 183-192.
15. Some elementary distributions of stress in three dimensions, Proc. Lond. Math. Soc. 32 (1900) 23-35.
16. Elementary distributions of plane stress, Proc. Lond. Math. Soc. 32 (1900) 35-61.
17. The stress in an aeolotropic elastic solid with an infinite plane boundary, Proc. Lond. Math. Soc. 32 (1900) 247-258.
18. The stress in the web of a plate girder, Quart. J. Pure Appl. Math. 31 (1900) 377-382.
19. The theory of uniformly loaded beams, Quart. J. Pure Appl. Math. 32 (1900) 28-42.
20. The determination of the stress in an isotropic elastic sphere by means of intrinsic equations, Messeng. Math. n.s. 350 (1900) 16-25.
21. The uniplanar stability of a rigid body, Messeng. Math. n.s. 351 (1900) 35-40.
22. The inversion of plane stress, Proc. Lond. Math. Soc. 34 (1902) 134-142.
23. The flexure of a circular plate, Proc. Lond. Math. Soc. 34 (1902) 223-228.
24. (with M.H. Belz) The elements of mathematical analysis (2 vols) Macmillan 1937.
