= Flamant (company) =

- Company type: Private
- Industry: Retail
- Founded: Geraardsbergen (East Flanders), Belgium (1978)
- Founder: Alex Flamant
- Headquarters: Geraardsbergen, Belgium
- Area served: Worldwide
- Products: Interior design
- Website: www.flamant.com

Flamant is a multinational interior and home decoration brand, headquartered in Geraardsbergen, Belgium. The company has its own stores in Belgium, France, Germany and Italy and operates a wholesale network of about 500 multi-brand stores worldwide. It was granted a royal warrant of the Court of Belgium in 2007, that was renewed in 2014 with the succession of Philippe to the Belgian throne.

== History ==
In 1978 Alex Flamant took over his father's antique shop and expanded the business into an interior decoration concept. During the 1990s Flamant opened stores in Antwerp, Brussels, Ghent, Knokke-Zoute and Lille. During the first decade of the new millennium Flamant opened stores in Paris, Hamburg, Milan, Düsseldorf and Bordeaux.

In 2009 Edwin Vandermeulen was named the new CEO of the company. An online shop was launched in 2012. Subsequent store openings include the new Antwerp shop at the former royal palace in Antwerp, where Flamant occupies the listed coach house. Flamant opened its fourth retail store in France, located in a boutique in Lyon, in October 2013.

== Products ==
The collection consists of furniture and home accessories and decorations: from dinnerware to dining tables and from bed linens to sofas. The brand also has a paint collection. The style is described as a combination of classic and modern, charming and bohemian.

The department Flamant Projects realizes hospitality projects. Plan-drawing, 3D visualization, furniture production and installation are among their services.
