= Membrane analogy =

The elastic membrane analogy, also known as the soap-film analogy, was first published by pioneering aerodynamicist Ludwig Prandtl in 1903. It describes the stress distribution on a long bar in torsion. The cross section of the bar is constant along its length, and need not be circular. The differential equation that governs the stress distribution on the bar in torsion is of the same form as the equation governing the shape of a membrane under differential pressure. Therefore, in order to discover the stress distribution on the bar, all one has to do is cut the shape of the cross section out of a piece of wood, cover it with a soap film, and apply a differential pressure across it. Then the slope of the soap film at any area of the cross section is directly proportional to the stress in the bar at the same point on its cross section.

== Application to thin-walled, open cross sections ==
While the membrane analogy allows the stress distribution on any cross section to be determined experimentally, it also allows the stress distribution on thin-walled, open cross sections to be determined by the same theoretical approach that describes the behavior of rectangular sections. Using the membrane analogy, any thin-walled cross section can be "stretched out" into a rectangle without affecting the stress distribution under torsion. The maximum shear stress, therefore, occurs at the edge of the midpoint of the stretched cross section, and is equal to $3T/bt^2$, where T is the torque applied, b is the length of the stretched cross section, and t is the thickness of the cross section.

It can be shown that the differential equation for the deflection surface of a homogeneous membrane, subjected to uniform lateral pressure and with uniform surface tension and with the same outline as that of the cross section of a bar under torsion, has the same form as that governing the stress distribution over the cross section of a bar under torsion.

== Other applications ==
Prandtl's stretched-membrane concept was used extensively in the field of electron tube ("vacuum tube") design (1930's to 1960's) to model the trajectory of electrons within a device. The model is constructed by uniformly stretching a thin rubber sheet over a frame, and deforming the sheet upwards with physical models of electrodes, impressed into the sheet from below. The entire assembly is tilted, and steel balls (as electron analogs) rolled down the assembly and the trajectories noted. The curved surface surrounding the "electrodes" represents the complex increase in field strength as the electron-analog approaches the "electrode"; the upward distortion in the sheet is a close analogy to field strength.
