= Linear elasticity =

Mathematical model of how solid objects deform

Linear elasticity is a mathematical model of how solid objects deform and become internally stressed by prescribed loading conditions. It is a simplification of the more general nonlinear theory of elasticity and a branch of continuum mechanics.

The fundamental assumptions of linear elasticity are infinitesimal strains — meaning, "small" deformations — and linear relationships between the components of stress and strain — hence the "linear" in its name. Linear elasticity is valid only for stress states that do not produce yielding. Its assumptions are reasonable for many engineering materials and engineering design scenarios. Linear elasticity is therefore used extensively in structural analysis and engineering design, often with the aid of finite element analysis.

== Mathematical formulation ==
Equations governing a linear elastic boundary value problem are based on three tensor partial differential equations for the balance of linear momentum and six infinitesimal strain-displacement relations. The system of differential equations is completed by a set of linear algebraic constitutive relations.

=== Direct tensor form ===
In direct tensor form that is independent of the choice of coordinate system, these governing equations are:

- Cauchy momentum equation, which is an expression of Newton's second law. In convective form it is written as:
  $$\boldsymbol{\nabla} \cdot \boldsymbol{\sigma} + \mathbf{F} = \rho \ddot{\mathbf{u}}$$
- Strain-displacement equations:
  $$\boldsymbol{\varepsilon} = \tfrac{1}{2} \left[\boldsymbol{\nabla}\mathbf{u} + (\boldsymbol{\nabla}\mathbf{u})^\mathrm{T}\right]$$
- Constitutive equations. For elastic materials, Hooke's law represents the material behavior and relates the unknown stresses and strains. The general equation for Hooke's law is
  $$\boldsymbol{\sigma} = \mathsf{C}:\boldsymbol{\varepsilon},$$

where $\boldsymbol{\sigma}$ is the Cauchy stress tensor, $\boldsymbol{\varepsilon}$ is the infinitesimal strain tensor, $\mathbf{u}$ is the displacement vector, $\mathsf{C}$ is the fourth-order stiffness tensor, $\mathbf{F}$ is the body force per unit volume, $\rho$ is the mass density, $\boldsymbol{\nabla}$ represents the nabla operator, $(\bullet)^\mathrm{T}$ represents a transpose, $\ddot{(\bullet)}$ represents the second material derivative with respect to time, and $\mathsf{A}:\mathsf{B} = A_{ij}B_{ij}$ is the inner product of two second-order tensors (summation over repeated indices is implied).

=== Cartesian coordinate form ===
Expressed in terms of components with respect to a rectangular Cartesian coordinate system, the governing equations of linear elasticity are:

- Equation of motion:
  $$\sigma_{ji,j} + F_i = \rho \partial_{tt} u_i$$
  where the ${(\bullet)}_{,j}$ subscript is a shorthand for $\partial{(\bullet)} / \partial x_j$ and $\partial_{tt}$ indicates $\partial^2 / \partial t^2$, $\sigma_{ij} = \sigma_{ji}$ is the Cauchy stress tensor, $F_i$ is the body force density, $\rho$ is the mass density, and $u_i$ is the displacement.
  These are 3 independent equations with 6 independent unknowns (stresses).
  In engineering notation, they are:
  $$\begin{align}
\frac{\partial \sigma_x}{\partial x} + \frac{\partial \tau_{yx}}{\partial y} + \frac{\partial \tau_{zx}}{\partial z} + F_x = \rho \frac{\partial^2 u_x}{\partial t^2} \\
\frac{\partial \tau_{xy}}{\partial x} + \frac{\partial \sigma_y}{\partial y} + \frac{\partial \tau_{zy}}{\partial z} + F_y = \rho \frac{\partial^2 u_y}{\partial t^2} \\
\frac{\partial \tau_{xz}}{\partial x} + \frac{\partial \tau_{yz}}{\partial y} + \frac{\partial \sigma_z}{\partial z} + F_z = \rho \frac{\partial^2 u_z}{\partial t^2}
\end{align}$$
- Strain-displacement equations:
  $$\varepsilon_{ij} =\frac{1}{2} (u_{j,i} + u_{i,j})$$
  where $\varepsilon_{ij}=\varepsilon_{ji}\,\!$ is the strain. These are 6 independent equations relating strains and displacements with 9 independent unknowns (strains and displacements).
  In engineering notation, they are:
  $$\begin{align}
\epsilon_x=\frac{\partial u_x}{\partial x} \\
\epsilon_y=\frac{\partial u_y}{\partial y} \\
\epsilon_z=\frac{\partial u_z}{\partial z}
\end{align}
\qquad
\begin{align}
\gamma_{xy}=\frac{\partial u_x}{\partial y}+\frac{\partial u_y}{\partial x} \\
\gamma_{yz}=\frac{\partial u_y}{\partial z}+\frac{\partial u_z}{\partial y} \\
\gamma_{zx}=\frac{\partial u_z}{\partial x}+\frac{\partial u_x}{\partial z}
\end{align}$$
- Constitutive equations. The equation for Hooke's law is:
  $$\sigma_{ij} = C_{ijkl} \, \varepsilon_{kl}$$
  where $C_{ijkl}$ is the stiffness tensor. These are 6 independent equations relating stresses and strains. The requirement of the symmetry of the stress and strain tensors lead to equality of many of the elastic constants, reducing the number of different elements to 21 $C_{ijkl} = C_{klij} = C_{jikl} = C_{ijlk}$.

An elastostatic boundary value problem for an isotropic-homogeneous media is a system of 15 independent equations and equal number of unknowns (3 equilibrium equations, 6 strain-displacement equations, and 6 constitutive equations). By specifying the boundary conditions, the boundary value problem is fully defined. To solve the system two approaches can be taken according to boundary conditions of the boundary value problem: a displacement formulation, and a stress formulation.

=== Cylindrical coordinate form ===
In cylindrical coordinates ($r,\theta,z$) the equations of motion are
$$\begin{align}
& \frac{\partial \sigma_{rr}}{\partial r} + \frac{1}{r}\frac{\partial \sigma_{r\theta}}{\partial \theta} + \frac{\partial \sigma_{rz}}{\partial z} + \cfrac{1}{r}(\sigma_{rr}-\sigma_{\theta\theta}) + F_r = \rho~\frac{\partial^2 u_r}{\partial t^2} \\
& \frac{\partial \sigma_{r\theta}}{\partial r} + \frac{1}{r} \frac{\partial \sigma_{\theta\theta}}{\partial \theta} + \frac{\partial \sigma_{\theta z}}{\partial z} + \frac{2}{r}\sigma_{r\theta} + F_\theta = \rho~\frac{\partial^2 u_\theta}{\partial t^2} \\
& \frac{\partial \sigma_{rz}}{\partial r} + \frac{1}{r}\frac{\partial \sigma_{\theta z}}{\partial \theta} + \frac{\partial \sigma_{zz}}{\partial z} + \frac{1}{r} \sigma_{rz} + F_z = \rho~\frac{\partial^2 u_z}{\partial t^2}
\end{align}$$
The strain-displacement relations are
$$\begin{align}
\varepsilon_{rr} & = \frac{\partial u_r}{\partial r} ~;~~
\varepsilon_{\theta\theta}  = \frac{1}{r} \left(\cfrac{\partial u_\theta}{\partial \theta} + u_r\right) ~;~~
\varepsilon_{zz}  = \frac{\partial u_z}{\partial z} \\
\varepsilon_{r\theta} & = \frac{1}{2} \left(\cfrac{1}{r}\cfrac{\partial u_r}{\partial \theta} + \cfrac{\partial u_\theta}{\partial r}- \cfrac{u_\theta}{r}\right) ~;~~
\varepsilon_{\theta z}  = \cfrac{1}{2} \left(\cfrac{\partial u_\theta}{\partial z} + \cfrac{1}{r}\cfrac{\partial u_z}{\partial \theta}\right) ~;~~
\varepsilon_{zr} = \cfrac{1}{2} \left(\cfrac{\partial u_r}{\partial z} + \cfrac{\partial u_z}{\partial r}\right)
\end{align}$$
and the constitutive relations are the same as in Cartesian coordinates, except that the indices 1,2,3 now stand for $r$,$\theta$,$z$, respectively.

=== Spherical coordinate form ===
In spherical coordinates ($r,\theta,\phi$) the equations of motion are
$$\begin{align}
& \frac{\partial \sigma_{rr}}{\partial r} + \cfrac{1}{r}\frac{\partial \sigma_{r\theta}}{\partial \theta} + \cfrac{1}{r\sin\theta}\frac{\partial \sigma_{r\phi}}{\partial \phi} + \cfrac{1}{r} (2\sigma_{rr}-\sigma_{\theta\theta}-\sigma_{\phi\phi}+\sigma_{r\theta}\cot\theta) + F_r = \rho~\frac{\partial^2 u_r}{\partial t^2} \\
& \frac{\partial \sigma_{r\theta}}{\partial r} + \cfrac{1}{r}\frac{\partial \sigma_{\theta\theta}}{\partial \theta} + \cfrac{1}{r\sin\theta}\frac{\partial \sigma_{\theta \phi}}{\partial \phi} + \cfrac{1}{r}[(\sigma_{\theta\theta}-\sigma_{\phi\phi})\cot\theta + 3\sigma_{r\theta}] + F_\theta = \rho~\frac{\partial^2 u_\theta}{\partial t^2} \\
& \frac{\partial \sigma_{r\phi}}{\partial r} + \cfrac{1}{r}\frac{\partial \sigma_{\theta \phi}}{\partial \theta} + \cfrac{1}{r\sin\theta}\frac{\partial \sigma_{\phi\phi}}{\partial \phi} + \cfrac{1}{r}(2\sigma_{\theta\phi}\cot\theta+3\sigma_{r\phi}) + F_\phi = \rho~\frac{\partial^2 u_\phi}{\partial t^2}
\end{align}$$

Spherical coordinates (r, θ, φ) as commonly used in physics: radial distance r, polar angle θ (theta), and azimuthal angle φ (phi). The symbol ρ (rho) is often used instead of r.

The strain tensor in spherical coordinates is
$$\begin{align}
\varepsilon_{rr} & = \frac{\partial u_r}{\partial r}\\
\varepsilon_{\theta\theta}& = \frac{1}{r} \left(\frac{\partial u_\theta}{\partial \theta} + u_r\right)\\
\varepsilon_{\phi\phi} & = \frac{1}{r\sin\theta} \left(\frac{\partial u_\phi}{\partial \phi} + u_r\sin\theta + u_\theta\cos\theta\right)\\
\varepsilon_{r\theta} & = \frac{1}{2} \left(\frac{1}{r} \frac{\partial u_r}{\partial \theta} + \frac{\partial u_\theta}{\partial r} - \frac{u_\theta}{r}\right) \\
\varepsilon_{\theta \phi}  & = \frac{1}{2r} \left[\frac{1}{\sin\theta}\frac{\partial u_\theta}{\partial \phi} +\left(\frac{\partial u_\phi}{\partial \theta} - u_\phi \cot\theta\right)\right]\\
\varepsilon_{r \phi} & = \frac{1}{2} \left(\frac{1}{r \sin \theta} \frac{\partial u_r}{\partial \phi} + \frac{\partial u_\phi}{\partial r} - \frac{u_\phi}{r}\right).
\end{align}$$

== (An)isotropic (in)homogeneous media ==
In isotropic media, the stiffness tensor gives the relationship between the stresses (resulting internal stresses) and the strains (resulting deformations). For an isotropic medium, the stiffness tensor has no preferred direction: an applied force will give the same displacements (relative to the direction of the force) no matter the direction in which the force is applied. In the isotropic case, the stiffness tensor may be written:
$$C_{ijkl}
=  K \, \delta_{ij}\, \delta_{kl}
+ \mu\, (\delta_{ik}\delta_{jl}+\delta_{il}\delta_{jk}- \tfrac{2}{3}\, \delta_{ij}\,\delta_{kl})$$
where $\delta_{ij}$ is the Kronecker delta, K is the bulk modulus (or incompressibility), and $\mu$ is the shear modulus (or rigidity), two elastic moduli. If the medium is inhomogeneous, the isotropic model is sensible if either the medium is piecewise-constant or weakly inhomogeneous; in the strongly inhomogeneous smooth model, anisotropy has to be accounted for. If the medium is homogeneous, then the elastic moduli will be independent of the position in the medium. The constitutive equation may now be written as:
$$\sigma_{ij} = K \delta_{ij} \varepsilon_{kk} + 2\mu \left(\varepsilon_{ij} - \tfrac{1}{3} \delta_{ij} \varepsilon_{kk}\right).$$

This expression separates the stress into a scalar part on the left which may be associated with a scalar pressure, and a traceless part on the right which may be associated with shear forces. A simpler expression is:
$$\sigma_{ij} = \lambda \delta_{ij} \varepsilon_{kk}+2\mu\varepsilon_{ij}$$
where λ is Lamé's first parameter. Since the constitutive equation is simply a set of linear equations, the strain may be expressed as a function of the stresses as:
$$\varepsilon_{ij} = \frac{1}{9K} \delta_{ij} \sigma_{kk} + \frac{1}{2\mu} \left(\sigma_{ij} - \tfrac{1}{3} \delta_{ij} \sigma_{kk}\right)$$
which is again, a scalar part on the left and a traceless shear part on the right. More simply:
$$\varepsilon_{ij}
= \frac{1}{2\mu}\sigma_{ij} - \frac{\nu}{E} \delta_{ij}\sigma_{kk} = \frac{1}{E} [(1+\nu) \sigma_{ij}-\nu\delta_{ij}\sigma_{kk}]$$
where $\nu$ is Poisson's ratio and $E$ is Young's modulus.

=== Elastostatics ===
Elastostatics is the study of linear elasticity under the conditions of equilibrium, in which all forces on the elastic body sum to zero, and the displacements are not a function of time. The equilibrium equations are then
$$\sigma_{ji,j} + F_i = 0.$$
In engineering notation (with tau as shear stress),

- $\frac{\partial \sigma_x}{\partial x} + \frac{\partial \tau_{yx}}{\partial y} + \frac{\partial \tau_{zx}}{\partial z} + F_x = 0$
- $\frac{\partial \tau_{xy}}{\partial x} + \frac{\partial \sigma_y}{\partial y} + \frac{\partial \tau_{zy}}{\partial z} + F_y = 0$
- $\frac{\partial \tau_{xz}}{\partial x} + \frac{\partial \tau_{yz}}{\partial y} + \frac{\partial \sigma_z}{\partial z} + F_z = 0$

This section will discuss only the isotropic homogeneous case.

==== Displacement formulation ====
In this case, the displacements are prescribed everywhere in the boundary. In this approach, the strains and stresses are eliminated from the formulation, leaving the displacements as the unknowns to be solved for in the governing equations. First, the strain-displacement equations are substituted into the constitutive equations (Hooke's law), eliminating the strains as unknowns:
$$\sigma_{ij} = \lambda \delta_{ij} \varepsilon_{kk}+2\mu\varepsilon_{ij}
= \lambda\delta_{ij}u_{k,k}+\mu\left(u_{i,j}+u_{j,i}\right).$$
Differentiating (assuming $\lambda$ and $\mu$ are spatially uniform) yields:
$$\sigma_{ij,j} = \lambda u_{k,ki}+\mu\left(u_{i,jj}+u_{j,ij}\right).$$
Substituting into the equilibrium equation yields:
$$\lambda u_{k,ki}+\mu\left(u_{i,jj} + u_{j,ij}\right) + F_i = 0$$
or (replacing double (dummy) (=summation) indices k,k by j,j and interchanging indices, ij to, ji after the, by virtue of Schwarz' theorem)
$$\mu u_{i,jj} + (\mu+\lambda) u_{j,ji} + F_i = 0$$
where $\lambda$ and $\mu$ are Lamé parameters. In this way, the only unknowns left are the displacements, hence the name for this formulation. The governing equations obtained in this manner are called the elastostatic equations, the special case of the steady Navier–Cauchy equations given below.

Derivation of steady Navier–Cauchy equations in Engineering notation

First, the $x$-direction will be considered. Substituting the strain-displacement equations into the equilibrium equation in the $x$-direction we have
$$\sigma_x = 2 \mu \varepsilon_x + \lambda(\varepsilon_x + \varepsilon_y +\varepsilon_z) = 2 \mu \frac{\partial u_x}{\partial x} + \lambda \left(\frac{\partial u_x}{\partial x} + \frac{\partial u_y}{\partial y} + \frac{\partial u_z}{\partial z}\right)$$
$$\tau_{xy} = \mu\gamma_{xy} = \mu\left(\frac{\partial u_x}{\partial y} + \frac{\partial u_y}{\partial x}\right)$$
$$\tau_{xz} = \mu\gamma_{zx} = \mu\left(\frac{\partial u_z}{\partial x} + \frac{\partial u_x}{\partial z}\right)$$

Then substituting these equations into the equilibrium equation in the $x\,\!$-direction we have
$$\frac{\partial \sigma_x}{\partial x} + \frac{\partial \tau_{yx}}{\partial y} + \frac{\partial \tau_{zx}}{\partial z} + F_x = 0$$
$$\frac{\partial}{\partial x}\left( 2\mu\frac{\partial u_x}{\partial x}+ \lambda \left(\frac{\partial u_x}{\partial x} + \frac{\partial u_y}{\partial y}+ \frac{\partial u_z}{\partial z}\right)\right) + \mu\frac{\partial}{\partial y} \left(\frac{\partial u_x}{\partial y}+ \frac{\partial u_y}{\partial x}\right)+ \mu\frac{\partial}{\partial z} \left(\frac{\partial u_z}{\partial x} + \frac{\partial u_x}{\partial z}\right) +F_x=0$$

Using the assumption that $\mu$ and $\lambda$ are constant we can rearrange and get:
$$\left(\lambda+\mu\right)\frac{\partial}{\partial x} \left(\frac{\partial u_x}{\partial x} +\frac{\partial u_y}{\partial y} + \frac{\partial u_z}{\partial z}\right)+\mu \left(\frac{\partial^2 u_x}{\partial x^2} + \frac{\partial^2 u_x}{\partial y^2}+ \frac{\partial^2 u_x}{\partial z^2}\right) + F_x= 0$$

Following the same procedure for the $y\,\!$-direction and $z\,\!$-direction we have
$$\left(\lambda + \mu\right) \frac{\partial}{\partial y} \left(\frac{\partial u_x}{\partial x} +\frac{\partial u_y}{\partial y} +\frac{\partial u_z}{\partial z}\right)+\mu\left(\frac{\partial^2 u_y}{\partial x^2} + \frac{\partial^2 u_y}{\partial y^2} + \frac{\partial^2 u_y}{\partial z^2}\right) + F_y = 0$$
$$\left(\lambda+\mu\right) \frac{\partial}{\partial z} \left(\frac{\partial u_x}{\partial x} + \frac{\partial u_y}{\partial y} + \frac{\partial u_z}{\partial z}\right)+ \mu \left(\frac{\partial^2 u_z}{\partial x^2} + \frac{\partial^2 u_z}{\partial y^2} + \frac{\partial^2 u_z}{\partial z^2}\right) + F_z=0$$

These last 3 equations are the steady Navier–Cauchy equations, which can be also expressed in vector notation as
$$(\lambda+\mu) \nabla(\nabla \cdot \mathbf{u}) + \mu \nabla^2\mathbf{u} + \mathbf{F} = \boldsymbol{0}$$

Once the displacement field has been calculated, the displacements can be replaced into the strain-displacement equations to solve for strains, which later are used in the constitutive equations to solve for stresses.

===== The biharmonic equation =====
The elastostatic equation may be written:
$$(\alpha^2-\beta^2) u_{j,ij} + \beta^2 u_{i,mm} = -F_i.$$

Taking the divergence of both sides of the elastostatic equation and assuming the body forces has zero divergence (homogeneous in domain) ($F_{i,i}=0\,\!$) we have
$$(\alpha^2-\beta^2) u_{j,iij} + \beta^2u_{i,imm} = 0.$$

Noting that summed indices need not match, and that the partial derivatives commute, the two differential terms are seen to be the same and we have:
$$\alpha^2 u_{j,iij} = 0$$
from which we conclude that:
$$u_{j,iij} = 0.$$

Taking the Laplacian of both sides of the elastostatic equation, and assuming in addition $F_{i,kk}=0\,\!$, we have
$$(\alpha^2-\beta^2) u_{j,kkij} + \beta^2u_{i,kkmm} = 0.$$

From the divergence equation, the first term on the left is zero (Note: again, the summed indices need not match) and we have:
$$\beta^2 u_{i,kkmm} = 0$$
from which we conclude that:
$$u_{i,kkmm} = 0$$
or, in coordinate free notation $\nabla^4 \mathbf{u} = 0$ which is just the biharmonic equation in $\mathbf{u}\,\!$.

==== Stress formulation ====
In this case, the surface tractions are prescribed everywhere on the surface boundary. In this approach, the strains and displacements are eliminated leaving the stresses as the unknowns to be solved for in the governing equations. Once the stress field is found, the strains are then found using the constitutive equations.

There are six independent components of the stress tensor which need to be determined, yet in the displacement formulation, there are only three components of the displacement vector which need to be determined. This means that there are some constraints which must be placed upon the stress tensor, to reduce the number of degrees of freedom to three. Using the constitutive equations, these constraints are derived directly from corresponding constraints which must hold for the strain tensor, which also has six independent components. The constraints on the strain tensor are derivable directly from the definition of the strain tensor as a function of the displacement vector field, which means that these constraints introduce no new concepts or information. It is the constraints on the strain tensor that are most easily understood. If the elastic medium is visualized as a set of infinitesimal cubes in the unstrained state, then after the medium is strained, an arbitrary strain tensor must yield a situation in which the distorted cubes still fit together without overlapping. In other words, for a given strain, there must exist a continuous vector field (the displacement) from which that strain tensor can be derived. The constraints on the strain tensor that are required to assure that this is the case were discovered by Saint Venant, and are called the "Saint Venant compatibility equations". These are 81 equations, 6 of which are independent non-trivial equations, which relate the different strain components. These are expressed in index notation as:
$$\varepsilon_{ij,km}+\varepsilon_{km,ij}-\varepsilon_{ik,jm}-\varepsilon_{jm,ik}=0.$$
In engineering notation, they are:
$$\begin{align}
&\frac{\partial^2 \epsilon_x}{\partial y^2} + \frac{\partial^2 \epsilon_y}{\partial x^2} = 2 \frac{\partial^2 \epsilon_{xy}}{\partial x \partial y} \\
&\frac{\partial^2 \epsilon_y}{\partial z^2} + \frac{\partial^2 \epsilon_z}{\partial y^2} = 2 \frac{\partial^2 \epsilon_{yz}}{\partial y \partial z} \\
&\frac{\partial^2 \epsilon_x}{\partial z^2} + \frac{\partial^2 \epsilon_z}{\partial x^2} = 2 \frac{\partial^2 \epsilon_{zx}}{\partial z \partial x} \\
&\frac{\partial^2 \epsilon_x}{\partial y \partial z} = \frac{\partial}{\partial x} \left ( -\frac{\partial \epsilon_{yz}}{\partial x} + \frac{\partial \epsilon_{zx}}{\partial y} + \frac{\partial \epsilon_{xy}}{\partial z}\right) \\
&\frac{\partial^2 \epsilon_y}{\partial z \partial x} = \frac{\partial}{\partial y} \left ( \frac{\partial \epsilon_{yz}}{\partial x} - \frac{\partial \epsilon_{zx}}{\partial y} + \frac{\partial \epsilon_{xy}}{\partial z}\right) \\
&\frac{\partial^2 \epsilon_z}{\partial x \partial y} = \frac{\partial}{\partial z} \left ( \frac{\partial \epsilon_{yz}}{\partial x} + \frac{\partial \epsilon_{zx}}{\partial y} - \frac{\partial \epsilon_{xy}}{\partial z}\right)
\end{align}$$

The strains in this equation are then expressed in terms of the stresses using the constitutive equations, which yields the corresponding constraints on the stress tensor. These constraints on the stress tensor are known as the Beltrami-Michell equations of compatibility:
$$\sigma_{ij,kk} + \frac{1}{1+\nu}\sigma_{kk,ij} + F_{i,j} + F_{j,i} + \frac{\nu}{1-\nu}\delta_{i,j} F_{k,k} = 0.$$
In the special situation where the body force is homogeneous, the above equations reduce to
$$(1+\nu)\sigma_{ij,kk}+\sigma_{kk,ij}=0.$$

A necessary, but insufficient, condition for compatibility under this situation is $\boldsymbol{\nabla}^4\boldsymbol{\sigma} = \boldsymbol{0}$ or $\sigma_{ij,kk\ell\ell} = 0$.

These constraints, along with the equilibrium equation (or equation of motion for elastodynamics) allow the calculation of the stress tensor field. Once the stress field has been calculated from these equations, the strains can be obtained from the constitutive equations, and the displacement field from the strain-displacement equations.

An alternative solution technique is to express the stress tensor in terms of stress functions which automatically yield a solution to the equilibrium equation. The stress functions then obey a single differential equation which corresponds to the compatibility equations.

==== Solutions for elastostatic cases ====
===== Thomson's solution - point force in an infinite isotropic medium =====
Thomson's solution or Kelvin's solution is the most important solution of the Navier–Cauchy or elastostatic equation is for that of a force acting at a point in an infinite isotropic medium. This solution was found by William Thomson (later Lord Kelvin) in 1848 (Thomson 1848). This solution is the analog of Coulomb's law in electrostatics. A derivation is given in Landau & Lifshitz. Defining
$$a = 1-2\nu$$
$$b = 2(1-\nu) = a+1$$
where $\nu$ is Poisson's ratio, the solution may be expressed as
$$u_i = G_{ik} F_k$$
where $F_k$ is the force vector being applied at the point, and $G_{ik}$ is a tensor Green's function which may be written in Cartesian coordinates as:
$$G_{ik} = \frac{1}{4\pi\mu r} \left[ \left(1 - \frac{1}{2b}\right) \delta_{ik} + \frac{1}{2b} \frac{x_i x_k}{r^2} \right]$$

It may be also compactly written as:
$$G_{ik} = \frac{1}{4\pi\mu} \left[\frac{\delta_{ik}}{r} - \frac{1}{2b} \frac{\partial^2 r}{\partial x_i \partial x_k}\right]$$
and it may be explicitly written as:
$$G_{ik}=\frac{1}{4\pi\mu r} \begin{bmatrix}
1-\frac{1}{2b}+\frac{1}{2b}\frac{x^2}{r^2} &
\frac{1}{2b}\frac{xy} {r^2} &
\frac{1}{2b}\frac{xz} {r^2} \\
\frac{1}{2b}\frac{yx} {r^2} &
1-\frac{1}{2b}+\frac{1}{2b}\frac{y^2}{r^2} &
\frac{1}{2b}\frac{yz} {r^2} \\
\frac{1}{2b}\frac{zx} {r^2} &
\frac{1}{2b}\frac{zy} {r^2} &
1-\frac{1}{2b}+\frac{1}{2b}\frac{z^2}{r^2}
\end{bmatrix}$$

In cylindrical coordinates ($\rho,\phi,z\,\!$) it may be written as:
$$G_{ik} = \frac{1}{4\pi \mu r} \begin{bmatrix}
1 - \frac{1}{2b} \frac{z^2}{r^2} & 0 & \frac{1}{2b} \frac{\rho z}{r^2}\\
0 & 1 - \frac{1}{2b} & 0\\
\frac{1}{2b} \frac{z \rho}{r^2}& 0 & 1 - \frac{1}{2b} \frac{\rho^2}{r^2}
\end{bmatrix}$$
where r is total distance to point.

It is particularly helpful to write the displacement in cylindrical coordinates for a point force $F_z$ directed along the z-axis. Defining $\hat{\boldsymbol{\rho}}$ and $\hat{\mathbf{z}}$ as unit vectors in the $\rho$ and $z$ directions respectively yields:
$$\mathbf{u} = \frac{F_z}{4\pi\mu r} \left[\frac{1}{4(1-\nu)} \, \frac{\rho z}{r^2} \hat{\boldsymbol{\rho}} + \left(1-\frac{1}{4(1-\nu)}\,\frac{\rho^2}{r^2}\right)\hat{\mathbf{z}}\right]$$

It can be seen that there is a component of the displacement in the direction of the force, which diminishes, as is the case for the potential in electrostatics, as 1/r for large r. There is also an additional ρ-directed component.

====== Frequency domain Green's function ======
Rewrite the Navier-Cauchy equations in component form

$$(\lambda + \mu)\partial_i \partial_j u_j +\mu\partial_j\partial_j u_i =-F_i$$

Convert this to frequency domain, where derivative $\partial_i$ maps to $\sqrt{-1}q_i$, where $q$ is the wave vector
$$(\lambda + \mu)q_i q_j u_j +\mu|q|^2u_i =F_i$$

Spatial frequency domain force to displacement Green's function is the inverse of the above

$G_{ij}(q) = \frac{1}{\mu}\bigg[\frac{\delta_{ij}}{|q|^2} -\frac{1}{b}\frac{q_iq_j}{|q|^4}\bigg]$

The stress to strain Green's function $\Gamma$ is $\Gamma_{khij} = \frac{1}{4\mu |q|^2}(\delta_{ki}q_hq_j+\delta_{hi}q_kq_j+\delta_{kj}q_hq_i+\delta_{hj}q_kq_i) -\frac{\lambda+\mu}{\mu(\lambda+2\mu)}\frac{q_iq_jq_kq_h}{|q|^4}$

where $\epsilon_{kh} = \Gamma_{khij}\sigma_{ij}$

===== Boussinesq–Cerruti solution - point force at the origin of an infinite isotropic half-space =====
Another useful solution is that of a point force acting on the surface of an infinite half-space. It was derived by Boussinesq for the normal force and Cerruti for the tangential force and a derivation is given in Landau & Lifshitz. In this case, the solution is again written as a Green's tensor which goes to zero at infinity, and the component of the stress tensor normal to the surface vanishes. This solution may be written in Cartesian coordinates as [recall: $a=(1-2\nu)$ and $b=2(1-\nu)$, $\nu$ = Poisson's ratio]:

$$G_{ik} = \frac{1}{4\pi\mu r}
\begin{bmatrix}
\frac{b r + z}{r + z} + \frac{(2 r (\nu r + z) + z^2) x^2}{r^2 (r + z)^2} &
\frac{(2 r (\nu r + z) + z^2) x y}{r^2 (r + z)^2} &
\frac{x z}{r^2} - \frac{a x}{r + z} \\
\frac{(2 r (\nu r + z) + z^2) y x}{r^2 (r + z)^2} &
\frac{b r + z}{r + z} + \frac{(2 r (\nu r + z) + z^2) y^2}{r^2 (r + z)^2} &
\frac{y z}{r^2} - \frac{a y}{r + z} \\
\frac{z x}{r^2} + \frac{a x}{r + z} &
\frac{z y}{r^2} + \frac{a y}{r + z} &
b + \frac{z^2}{r^2}
\end{bmatrix}$$

===== Other solutions =====
- Point force inside an infinite isotropic half-space.
- Contact of two elastic bodies: the Hertz solution (see Matlab code). See also the page on Contact mechanics.

=== Elastodynamics in terms of displacements ===
Elastodynamics is the study of elastic waves and involves linear elasticity with variation in time. An elastic wave is a type of mechanical wave that propagates in elastic or viscoelastic materials. The elasticity of the material provides the restoring force of the wave. When they occur in the Earth as the result of an earthquake or other disturbance, elastic waves are usually called seismic waves.

The linear momentum equation is simply the equilibrium equation with an additional inertial term:
$$\sigma_{ji,j}+ F_i = \rho\,\ddot{u}_i = \rho \, \partial_{tt} u_i.$$

If the material is governed by anisotropic Hooke's law (with the stiffness tensor homogeneous throughout the material), one obtains the displacement equation of elastodynamics:
$$\left( C_{ijkl} u_{(k},_{l)}\right) ,_{j}+F_{i}=\rho \ddot{u}_{i}.$$

If the material is isotropic and homogeneous, one obtains the (general, or transient) Navier–Cauchy equation:
$$\mu u_{i,jj} + (\mu+\lambda)u_{j,ij}+F_i=\rho\partial_{tt}u_i
\quad \text{or} \quad
\mu \nabla^2\mathbf{u} + (\mu+\lambda)\nabla(\nabla\cdot\mathbf{u}) + \mathbf{F}=\rho\frac{\partial^2\mathbf{u}}{\partial t^2}.$$

The elastodynamic wave equation can also be expressed as
$$\left(\delta_{kl} \partial_{tt} - A_{kl}[\nabla]\right) u_l = \frac{1}{\rho} F_k$$
where
$$A_{kl}[\nabla]=\frac{1}{\rho} \, \partial_i \, C_{iklj} \, \partial_j$$
is the acoustic differential operator, and $\delta_{kl}$ is Kronecker delta.

In isotropic media, the stiffness tensor has the form
$$C_{ijkl}
= K \, \delta_{ij}\, \delta_{kl}
+ \mu\, (\delta_{ik}\delta_{jl} + \delta_{il} \delta_{jk} - \frac{2}{3}\, \delta_{ij}\, \delta_{kl})$$
where $K$ is the bulk modulus (or incompressibility), and $\mu$ is the shear modulus (or rigidity), two elastic moduli. If the material is homogeneous (i.e. the stiffness tensor is constant throughout the material), the acoustic operator becomes:
$$A_{ij}[\nabla] = \alpha^2 \partial_i \partial_j + \beta^2 (\partial_m \partial_m \delta_{ij} - \partial_i \partial_j)$$

For plane waves, the above differential operator becomes the acoustic algebraic operator:
$$A_{ij}[\mathbf{k}] = \alpha^2 k_i k_j + \beta^2(k_m k_m \delta_{ij}-k_i k_j)$$
where
$$\alpha^2 = \left(K+\frac{4}{3}\mu\right)/\rho \qquad \beta^2 = \mu / \rho$$
are the eigenvalues of $A[\hat{\mathbf{k}}]$ with eigenvectors $\hat{\mathbf{u}}$ parallel and orthogonal to the propagation direction $\hat{\mathbf{k}}\,\!$, respectively. The associated waves are called longitudinal and shear elastic waves. In the seismological literature, the corresponding plane waves are called P-waves and S-waves (see Seismic wave).

=== Elastodynamics in terms of stresses ===
Elimination of displacements and strains from the governing equations leads to the Ignaczak equation of elastodynamics
$$\left( \rho ^{-1} \sigma _{(ik},_{k}\right) ,_{j)} - S_{ijkl} \ddot{\sigma}_{kl} + \left( \rho ^{-1} F_{(i}\right) ,_{j)} = 0.$$

In the case of local isotropy, this reduces to
$$\left( \rho ^{-1} \sigma _{(ik},_{k}\right) ,_{j)} - \frac{1}{2\mu } \left(
\ddot{\sigma}_{ij} - \frac{\lambda }{3 \lambda +2\mu }\ddot{\sigma}_{kk}\delta
_{ij}\right) +\left( \rho ^{-1} F_{(i}\right) ,_{j)} = 0.$$

The principal characteristics of this formulation include: (1) avoids gradients of compliance but introduces gradients of mass density; (2) it is derivable from a variational principle; (3) it is advantageous for handling traction initial-boundary value problems, (4) allows a tensorial classification of elastic waves, (5) offers a range of applications in elastic wave propagation problems; (6) can be extended to dynamics of classical or micropolar solids with interacting fields of diverse types (thermoelastic, fluid-saturated porous, piezoelectro-elastic...) as well as nonlinear media.

== Anisotropic homogeneous media ==
For anisotropic media, the stiffness tensor $C_{ijkl}$ is more complicated. The symmetry of the stress tensor $\sigma_{ij}$ means that there are at most 6 different elements of stress. Similarly, there are at most 6 different elements of the strain tensor $\varepsilon_{ij}\,\!$. Hence the fourth-order stiffness tensor $C_{ijkl}$ may be written as a matrix $C_{\alpha \beta}$ (a tensor of second order). Voigt notation is the standard mapping for tensor indices,
$$\begin{matrix}
ij & =\\
\Downarrow & \\
\alpha  & =
\end{matrix}
\begin{matrix}
11 & 22 & 33 & 23,32 & 13,31 & 12,21 \\
\Downarrow & \Downarrow & \Downarrow & \Downarrow & \Downarrow & \Downarrow & \\
1  &2 &  3 &  4 &  5 & 6
\end{matrix}$$

With this notation, one can write the elasticity matrix for any linearly elastic medium as:
$$C_{ijkl}  \Rightarrow C_{\alpha \beta} = \begin{bmatrix}
C_{11} & C_{12} & C_{13} & C_{14} & C_{15} & C_{16} \\
C_{12} & C_{22} & C_{23} & C_{24} & C_{25} & C_{26} \\
C_{13} & C_{23} & C_{33} & C_{34} & C_{35} & C_{36} \\
C_{14} & C_{24} & C_{34} & C_{44} & C_{45} & C_{46} \\
C_{15} & C_{25} & C_{35} & C_{45} & C_{55} & C_{56} \\
C_{16} & C_{26} & C_{36} & C_{46} & C_{56} & C_{66}
\end{bmatrix}.$$

As shown, the matrix $C_{\alpha \beta}$ is symmetric, this is a result of the existence of a strain energy density function which satisfies $\sigma_{ij} = \frac{\partial W}{\partial\varepsilon_{ij}}$. Hence, there are at most 21 different elements of $C_{\alpha \beta}\,\!$.

The isotropic special case has 2 independent elements:
$$C_{\alpha \beta} = \begin{bmatrix}
K+4 \mu\ /3  & K-2 \mu\ /3 & K-2 \mu\ /3 & 0 & 0  & 0 \\
K-2 \mu\ /3  & K+4 \mu\ /3 &  K-2 \mu\ /3 & 0 & 0  & 0 \\
K-2 \mu\ /3  & K-2 \mu\ /3 & K+4 \mu\ /3 & 0 & 0  & 0 \\
0  & 0 & 0 & \mu\ & 0  & 0 \\
0  & 0 & 0 & 0 & \mu\  & 0 \\
0  & 0 & 0 & 0 & 0  & \mu\
\end{bmatrix}.$$

The simplest anisotropic case, that of cubic symmetry has 3 independent elements:
$$C_{\alpha \beta} = \begin{bmatrix}
C_{11}  &  C_{12} &  C_{12} & 0 & 0  & 0 \\
C_{12}  &  C_{11} &  C_{12} & 0 & 0  & 0 \\
C_{12}  & C_{12}  &  C_{11} & 0 & 0  & 0 \\
0  & 0 & 0 & C_{44} & 0  & 0 \\
0  & 0 & 0 & 0 & C_{44}  & 0 \\
0  & 0 & 0 & 0 & 0  & C_{44}
\end{bmatrix}.$$

The case of transverse isotropy, also called polar anisotropy, (with a single axis (the 3-axis) of symmetry) has 5 independent elements:
$$C_{\alpha \beta} = \begin{bmatrix}
C_{11}  &  C_{11}-2C_{66} &  C_{13} & 0 & 0  & 0 \\
C_{11}-2C_{66}  &  C_{11} &  C_{13} & 0 & 0  & 0 \\
C_{13}  & C_{13}  &  C_{33} & 0 & 0  & 0 \\
0  & 0 & 0 & C_{44} & 0  & 0 \\
0  & 0 & 0 & 0 & C_{44}  & 0 \\
0  & 0 & 0 & 0 & 0  & C_{66}
\end{bmatrix}.$$

When the transverse isotropy is weak (i.e. close to isotropy), an alternative parametrization utilizing Thomsen parameters, is convenient for the formulas for wave speeds.

The case of orthotropy (the symmetry of a brick) has 9 independent elements:
$$C_{\alpha \beta} = \begin{bmatrix}
C_{11} & C_{12} & C_{13} & 0 & 0 & 0 \\
C_{12} & C_{22} & C_{23} & 0 & 0 & 0 \\
C_{13} & C_{23} & C_{33} & 0 & 0 & 0 \\
0  & 0 & 0 & C_{44} & 0 & 0 \\
0  & 0 & 0 & 0 & C_{55} & 0 \\
0  & 0 & 0 & 0 & 0 & C_{66}
\end{bmatrix}.$$

=== Elastodynamics ===
The elastodynamic wave equation for anisotropic media can be expressed as
$$(\delta_{kl} \partial_{tt} - A_{kl}[\nabla])\, u_l = \frac{1}{\rho} F_k$$
where
$$A_{kl}[\nabla]=\frac{1}{\rho} \, \partial_i \, C_{iklj} \, \partial_j$$
is the acoustic differential operator, and $\delta_{kl}$ is Kronecker delta.

==== Plane waves and Christoffel equation ====
A plane wave has the form
$$\mathbf{u}[\mathbf{x}, \, t] = U[\mathbf{k} \cdot  \mathbf{x} - \omega \, t] \, \hat{\mathbf{u}}$$
with $\hat{\mathbf{u}}\,\!$ of unit length. It is a solution of the wave equation with zero forcing, if and only if $\omega^2$ and $\hat{\mathbf{u}}$ constitute an eigenvalue/eigenvector pair of the acoustic algebraic operator
$$A_{kl}[\mathbf{k}]=\frac{1}{\rho} \, k_i \, C_{iklj} \, k_j.$$
This propagation condition (also known as the Christoffel equation) may be written as
$$A[\hat{\mathbf{k}}] \, \hat{\mathbf{u}} = c^2 \, \hat{\mathbf{u}}$$
where $\hat{\mathbf{k}} = \mathbf{k} / \sqrt{\mathbf{k}\cdot\mathbf{k}}$ denotes propagation direction and $c = \omega / \sqrt{\mathbf{k} \cdot \mathbf{k}}$ is phase velocity.

== Some classical two-dimensional linear elasticity solutions ==
In the following

$$\begin{align}
G &= \frac{E}{2(1+\nu)} \quad \text{(Shear modulus)} \\
\kappa &= \begin{cases}
\dfrac{3-\nu}{1+\nu} & \text{Plane stress} \\[6pt]
3-4\nu & \text{Plane strain}
\end{cases}
\end{align}$$

Here, $E$ is the Young's modulus and $\nu$ is the Poisson's ratio.

=== Two-dimensional infinite plate with a traction-free hole of radius $a$ subjected to remote stress field $\sigma_{xx}=\sigma$ ===
The stress and displacement fields are given by (the orientation $\theta =0$, is along the $x$-axis)

$$\begin{align}
\sigma_{rr}(r,\theta) &= \frac{\sigma}{2} \left(1 - \frac{a^2}{r^2}\right)
+ \frac{\sigma}{2} \left(1 - \frac{4a^2}{r^2} + \frac{3a^4}{r^4}\right) \cos 2\theta \\
\sigma_{\theta\theta}(r,\theta) &= \frac{\sigma}{2} \left(1 + \frac{a^2}{r^2}\right)
- \frac{\sigma}{2} \left(1 + \frac{3a^4}{r^4}\right) \cos 2\theta \\
\sigma_{r\theta}(r,\theta) &= -\frac{\sigma}{2} \left(1 + \frac{2a^2}{r^2} - \frac{3a^4}{r^4}\right) \sin 2\theta
\end{align}$$

$$\begin{align}
u_r(r,\theta) &= \frac{\sigma}{4G} \Bigg[ \frac{r}{2} \left( \frac{\kappa-1}{2} + \cos 2\theta \right)
+ \frac{a^2}{r} \left(1 + \cos 2\theta\right)
- \frac{a^4}{2r^3} \cos 2\theta \Bigg] \\
u_\theta(r,\theta) &= \frac{\sigma}{4G} \Bigg[ -\frac{r}{2} \sin 2\theta
+ \frac{a^2}{r} \left( \frac{\kappa+1}{2} \right) \sin 2\theta
- \frac{a^4}{2r^3} \sin 2\theta \Bigg]
\end{align}$$

On the hole boundary:

$$\begin{align} \sigma_{rr}(a,\theta) &= 0, \quad \sigma_{r\theta}(a,\theta) = 0 \\ \sigma_{\theta\theta}(a,\theta) &= \sigma(1 - 2\cos 2\theta) \end{align}$$

The maximum hoop stress occurs at $\theta = \pi/2$;

$\sigma_{\theta\theta}^{\text{max}} = 3\sigma$

Thus, the stress concentration factor (SCF) is 3.

=== Flamant solution: Half-space under concentrated surface forces ===
See the article Flamant solution

=== Half-space under a uniform normal loading $\sigma_{yy}=-p$ acting over $-a\le x\le a$ and $y=0$ ===
Let the half-plane occupy the position $y\ge 0$. A uniform pressure loading is applied such that $\sigma_{yy}=-p$ acting over $-a\le x\le a$.

The stress fields are given by

$$\begin{align}
\sigma_{xx}=-\frac{p}{2\pi}\left[ 2(\theta_2-\theta_1 )+(\sin2\theta_2-\sin2\theta_1) \right]\\
\sigma_{yy}=-\frac{p}{2\pi}\left[ 2(\theta_2-\theta_1 )-(\sin2\theta_2-\sin2\theta_1) \right]\\
\sigma_{xy}=\frac{p}{2\pi}\left[ (\cos2\theta_2-\cos2\theta_1) \right]\\
\end{align}$$

where

$\tan\theta_{1,2}=\frac{z}{x\mp a}$.

The principal stresses are given by

$\sigma_{1,2}=-\frac{p}{\pi}(\alpha\mp\sin\alpha)$

where $\alpha = \theta_1-\theta_2$. The maximum shear stress is $\tau_{max}=\frac{p}{\pi}\sin\alpha$

== See also ==
- Castigliano's method
- Cauchy momentum equation
- Clapeyron's theorem
- Contact mechanics
- Deformation
- Elasticity (physics)
- GRADELA
- Hooke's law
- Infinitesimal strain theory
- Michell solution
- Plasticity (physics)
- Signorini problem
- Spring system
- Stress (mechanics)
- Stress functions
