= Stress functions =

Equations describing elastic deformation

In linear elasticity, the equations describing the deformation of an elastic body subject only to surface forces (or body forces that could be expressed as potentials) on the boundary are (using index notation) the equilibrium equation:

$$\sigma_{ij,i}=0\,$$

where $\sigma$ is the stress tensor, and the Beltrami-Michell compatibility equations:

$$\sigma_{ij,kk}+\frac{1}{1+\nu}\sigma_{kk,ij}=0$$

A general solution of these equations may be expressed in terms of the Beltrami stress tensor. Stress functions are derived as special cases of this Beltrami stress tensor which, although less general, sometimes will yield a more tractable method of solution for the elastic equations.

== Beltrami stress functions ==
It can be shown that a complete solution to the equilibrium equations may be written as

$$\sigma=\nabla \times \Phi \times \nabla$$

Using index notation:

$$\sigma_{ij}=\varepsilon_{ikm}\varepsilon_{jln}\Phi_{kl,mn}$$

Engineering notation
| $\sigma_x = \frac{\partial^2\Phi_{yy}}{\partial z \partial z} + \frac{\partial^2\Phi_{zz}}{\partial y \partial y} -2\frac{\partial^2\Phi_{yz}}{\partial y \partial z}$ | $\sigma_{xy} =-\frac{\partial^2\Phi_{xy}}{\partial z \partial z} -\frac{\partial^2\Phi_{zz}}{\partial x \partial y} +\frac{\partial^2\Phi_{yz}}{\partial x \partial z} +\frac{\partial^2\Phi_{zx}}{\partial y \partial z}$ |
| $\sigma_y = \frac{\partial^2\Phi_{xx}}{\partial z \partial z} +\frac{\partial^2\Phi_{zz}}{\partial x \partial x} -2\frac{\partial^2\Phi_{zx}}{\partial z \partial x}$ | $\sigma_{yz} =-\frac{\partial^2\Phi_{yz}}{\partial x \partial x} -\frac{\partial^2\Phi_{xx}}{\partial y \partial z} +\frac{\partial^2\Phi_{zx}}{\partial y \partial x} +\frac{\partial^2\Phi_{xy}}{\partial z \partial x}$ |
| $\sigma_z = \frac{\partial^2\Phi_{yy}}{\partial x \partial x} +\frac{\partial^2\Phi_{xx}}{\partial y \partial y} -2\frac{\partial^2\Phi_{xy}}{\partial x \partial y}$ | $\sigma_{zx} =-\frac{\partial^2\Phi_{zx}}{\partial y \partial y} -\frac{\partial^2\Phi_{yy}}{\partial z \partial x} +\frac{\partial^2\Phi_{xy}}{\partial z \partial y} +\frac{\partial^2\Phi_{yz}}{\partial x \partial y}$ |

where $\Phi_{mn}$ is a symmetric but otherwise arbitrary second-rank tensor field that is at least twice differentiable, and is known as the Beltrami stress tensor. Its components are known as Beltrami stress functions. $\varepsilon$ is the Levi-Civita pseudotensor, with all values equal to zero except those in which the indices are not repeated. For a set of non-repeating indices the component value will be +1 for even permutations of the indices, and -1 for odd permutations. And $\nabla$ is the Nabla operator. For the Beltrami stress tensor to satisfy the Beltrami-Michell compatibility equations in addition to the equilibrium equations, it is further required that $\Phi_{mn}$ is at least four times continuously differentiable.

== Maxwell stress functions ==
The Maxwell stress functions are defined by assuming that the Beltrami stress tensor $\Phi_{mn}$ is restricted to be of the form.

$$\Phi_{ij}=
\begin{bmatrix}
A&0&0\\
0&B&0\\
0&0&C
\end{bmatrix}$$

The stress tensor which automatically obeys the equilibrium equation may now be written as:

| $\sigma_x = \frac{\partial^2B}{\partial z^2} + \frac{\partial^2C}{\partial y^2}$ | $\sigma_{yz} =-\frac{\partial^2A}{\partial y \partial z}$ |
| $\sigma_y = \frac{\partial^2C}{\partial x^2} + \frac{\partial^2A}{\partial z^2}$ | $\sigma_{zx} = -\frac{\partial^2B}{\partial z \partial x}$ |
| $\sigma_z = \frac{\partial^2A}{\partial y^2} + \frac{\partial^2B}{\partial x^2}$ | $\sigma_{xy} =-\frac{\partial^2C}{\partial x \partial y}$ |

The solution to the elastostatic problem now consists of finding the three stress functions which give a stress tensor which obeys the Beltrami–Michell compatibility equations for stress. Substituting the expressions for the stress into the Beltrami–Michell equations yields the expression of the elastostatic problem in terms of the stress functions:

$$\nabla^4 A+\nabla^4 B+\nabla^4 C=3\left(
\frac{\partial^2 A}{\partial x^2}+
\frac{\partial^2 B}{\partial y^2}+
\frac{\partial^2 C}{\partial z^2}\right)/(2-\nu),$$

These must also yield a stress tensor which obeys the specified boundary conditions.

== Airy stress function ==
The Airy stress function is a special case of the Maxwell stress functions, in which it is assumed that A=B=0 and C is a function of x and y only. This stress function can therefore be used only for two-dimensional problems. In the elasticity literature, the stress function $C$ is usually represented by $\varphi$ and the stresses are expressed as

$$\sigma_x = \frac{\partial^2\varphi}{\partial y^2} ~;~~
\sigma_y = \frac{\partial^2\varphi}{\partial x^2} ~;~~
\sigma_{xy} = -\frac{\partial^2\varphi}{\partial x \partial y}-(f_{x}y+f_{y}x)$$

Where $f_{x}$ and $f_{y}$ are values of body forces in relevant direction.

In polar coordinates the expressions are:

$$\sigma_{rr} = \frac{1}{r}\frac{\partial \varphi}{\partial r} + \frac{1}{r^2}\frac{\partial^2\varphi}{\partial \theta^2} ~;~~
\sigma_{\theta\theta} = \frac{\partial^2\varphi}{\partial r^2} ~;~~
\sigma_{r\theta}=\sigma_{\theta r} = - \frac{\partial}{\partial r}\left( \frac{1}{r}\frac{\partial \varphi}{\partial\theta} \right)$$

== Morera stress functions ==
The Morera stress functions are defined by assuming that the Beltrami stress tensor $\Phi_{mn}$ tensor is restricted to be of the form

$$\Phi_{ij}=
\begin{bmatrix}
0&C&B\\
C&0&A\\
B&A&0
\end{bmatrix}$$

The solution to the elastostatic problem now consists of finding the three stress functions which give a stress tensor which obeys the Beltrami-Michell compatibility equations. Substituting the expressions for the stress into the Beltrami-Michell equations yields the expression of the elastostatic problem in terms of the stress functions:

| $\sigma_x = -2\frac{\partial^2 A}{\partial y \partial z}$ | $\sigma_{yz} =-\frac{\partial^2 A}{\partial x^2} +\frac{\partial^2 B}{\partial y \partial x} +\frac{\partial^2 C}{\partial z \partial x}$ |
| $\sigma_y = -2\frac{\partial^2 B}{\partial z \partial x}$ | $\sigma_{zx} =-\frac{\partial^2 B}{\partial y^2} +\frac{\partial^2 C}{\partial z \partial y} +\frac{\partial^2 A}{\partial x \partial y}$ |
| $\sigma_z = -2\frac{\partial^2 C}{\partial x \partial y}$ | $\sigma_{xy} =-\frac{\partial^2 C}{\partial z^2} +\frac{\partial^2 A}{\partial x \partial z} +\frac{\partial^2 B}{\partial y \partial z}$ |

== Prandtl stress function ==
The Prandtl stress function is a special case of the Morera stress functions, in which it is assumed that A=B=0 and C is a function of x and y only.

=== Application to bar in torsion ===
For an elastic bar undergoing Saint-Venant torsion about the $z$-axis, the shear stresses can be expressed as

$$\tau_{xz}=\frac{\partial \phi}{\partial y} ~;~~ \tau_{yz}=-\frac{\partial \phi}{\partial x}$$

where the Prandtl stress function $\phi$ satisfies

$$\frac{\partial^2 \phi}{\partial y^2} + \frac{\partial^2 \phi}{\partial x^2}= -2 G \theta'$$

Where $G$ is the shear modulus and $\theta'$ is the rate of twist (change in angle per unit length). Applying the traction-free boundary condition at the outer surface of the bar leads to the result that the outer surface of the bar is a contour of the stress function. The shear stress in the bar acts along the contour of the stress function, and is proportional to the slope.

The differential equation satisfied by the stress function ($\nabla^2 \phi = -k$, Poisson's equation) is the same as that governing the static deflected shape of an elastic membrane under uniform tension and pressure. This observation is the basis of the membrane analogy for shear stress in torsion.

== See also ==
- Elasticity (physics)
- Elastic modulus
- Infinitesimal strain theory
- Linear elasticity
- Solid mechanics
- Stress (mechanics)
