= Isentropic expansion waves =

Waves created by the redirection of supersonic flow along a curved surface

In fluid dynamics, isentropic expansion waves are created when a supersonic flow is redirected along a curved surface. These waves are studied to obtain a relation between deflection angle and Mach number. Each wave in this case is a Mach wave, so it is at an angle $\alpha = \sin^{-1}\tfrac{1}{M},$ where M is the Mach number immediately before the wave. Expansion waves are divergent because as the flow expands the value of Mach number increases, thereby decreasing the Mach angle.

In an isentropic wave, the speed changes from v to v + dv, with deflection dθ. We have oriented the coordinate system orthogonal to the wave. We write the basic equations (continuity, momentum and the first and second laws of thermodynamics) for this infinitesimal control volume.

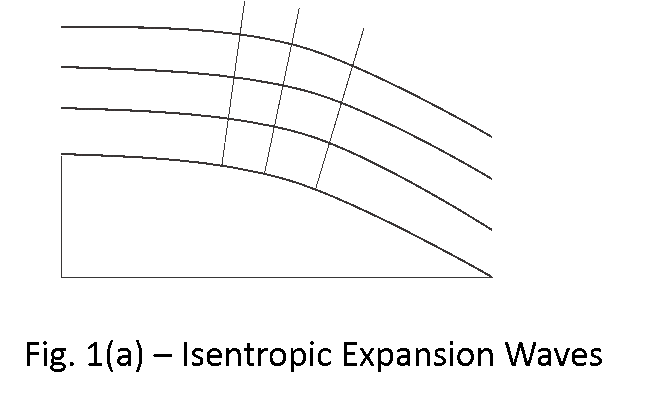
Expansion waves over curved surface

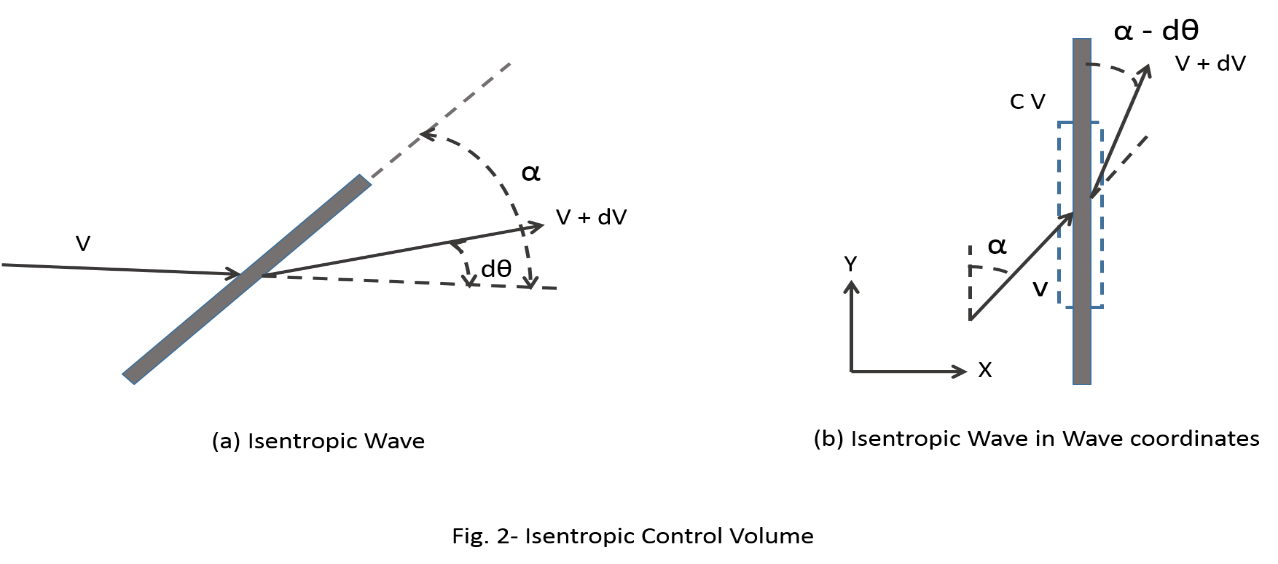
Control Volume Analysis

== Relation between θ, M and v ==
Assumptions:

1. Steady flow.
2. Negligible body forces.
3. Adiabatic flow.
4. No work terms.
5. Negligible gravitational effect.

The continuity equation is $\frac{\partial}{\partial t}\int\limits_{CV}\rho dV + \int\limits_{CS}\rho \bar v \, d\bar A = 0 \qquad\qquad (1.1)$

First term is zero by assumption (1). Now, ${-\rho v\sin \alpha A} + {(\rho +d \rho)(v+dv)\sin (a-d\theta)A} = 0$ which can be rewritten as $\rho v \sin\alpha = (\rho + d\rho)(v + dv) \sin(\alpha - d\theta) \qquad\qquad (1.2)$

Now we consider the momentum equation for normal and tangential to shock. For y-component, $F_{S_y} + F_{B_y} = \frac{\partial}{\partial t}\int\limits_{CV}v_y\rho dV + \int\limits_{CS}v_y\rho \bar v \, d\bar A \qquad\qquad (1.3)$

Second term of L.H.S and first term of R.H.S are zero by assumption (2) and (1) respectively. Then,

$0 = v\cos\alpha(-\rho v \sin\alpha A) + (v+dv)\cos(\alpha - d\theta){(\rho+d\rho)(v+dv)\sin(\alpha-d\theta)A}$

Or using equation 1.1 (continuity), $v\cos\alpha = (v+dv) \cos(\alpha - d\theta)$

Expanding and simplifying [Using the facts that, to the first order, in the limit as $d\theta\rightarrow 0$, $\cos{d\theta}\rightarrow 1$ and $\sin {d\theta}\rightarrow d\theta$], we obtain

$d\theta=\frac{-dv}{v\tan\alpha}$

But, $\sin\alpha=\frac{1}{M}$

so, $\tan\alpha=\frac{1}{\sqrt{M^2-1}}$

and $d\theta = -\frac{\sqrt{M^2 - 1}\ dv}{v} \qquad\qquad (1.4)$

== Derivation of Prandtl-Meyer supersonic expansion function ==
We skip the analysis of the x-component of the momentum and move on to the first law of thermodynamics, which is

$\dot{Q} - \dot{W}_s - \dot{W}_{shear} - \dot{W}_{other} = \frac{\partial}{\partial t} \int\limits_{CV}e\rho dV + \int\limits_{CS} h\rho \bar v.d\bar A \qquad\qquad (1.5)$

First term of L.H.S, next three terms of L.H.S and first term of R.H.S are zero due to assumption (3), (4) and (1) respectively.

where, $e = u + \frac{v^2}{2} + gz$

For our control volume we obtain

$0 = \left(h + \frac{v^2}{2}\right) (-\rho v \sin \alpha A) + \left[(h + dh) + \frac{(v + dv)^2}{2}\right]\bigl((\rho + d\rho)(v+dv)\sin(\alpha - d\theta)A \bigr)$

This may be simplified as

${h + \frac{v^2}{2}} = (h + dh) + \frac{(v + dv)^2}{2}$

Expanding and simplifying in the limit to first order, we get

$dh = -vdv$

If we confine to ideal gases, $dh=c_p dT$ , so

$c_p dT = -vdv \qquad\qquad (1.6)$

Above equation relates the differential changes in velocity and temperature. We can derive a relation between $M$ and $v$ using $v=Mc=M\sqrt{kRT}$. Differentiating (and dividing the left hand side by $v$ and the right by $\sqrt{kRT}$ ),

$\frac{dv}{v} = \frac{dM}{M} + \frac{dT}{2T}$

Using equation (1.6)

$$\begin{align}
\frac{dv}{v} &= \frac{dM}{M} - \frac{vdv}{2c_pT} \\[2pt]
&= \frac{dM}{M} - \frac{dv\frac{v^2}{c_p T}}{2v} \\[2pt]
&= \frac{dM}{M} - \frac{dv\frac{M^2 c^2}{c_pT}}{2v} \\[2pt]
&= \frac{dM}{M} - \frac{dv\frac{M^2 kRT}{c_p T}}{2v} \\[2pt]
&= \frac{dM}{M} - \frac{dv[M^2(k-1)]}{2v}
\end{align}$$

Hence,

$\frac{dv}{v} = \frac{2}{2 + M^2(k-1)}\frac{dM}{M} \qquad\qquad (1.7)$

Combining (1.4) and (1.7)

$\frac{d\theta}{2\sqrt{M^2 - 1}} = -\frac{1}{2 + M^2(k-1)}\frac{dM}{M} \qquad\qquad (1.8)$

We generally apply the above equation to negative $d\theta$, let $d\omega= d\theta$. We can integrate this between the initial and final Mach numbers of given flow, but it will be more convenient to integrate from a reference state, the critical speed ($M=1$) to Mach number $M$, with $\omega$ arbitrarily set to zero at $M=1$,

$\int\limits_0^\omega d\omega = \int\limits_1^M \frac{2\sqrt{M^2 - 1}}{2 + M^2(k-1)}\frac{dM}{M}$

Leading to Prandtl-Meyer supersonic expansion function,

$\omega = \sqrt{\frac{k+1}{k-1}} \tan^{-1}\left[\frac{\sqrt{k-1}}{\sqrt{k+1}}(M^2-1)\right] - \tan^{-1}(M^2 - 1)$
