= Theodor Meyer =

German physicist (1882–1972)

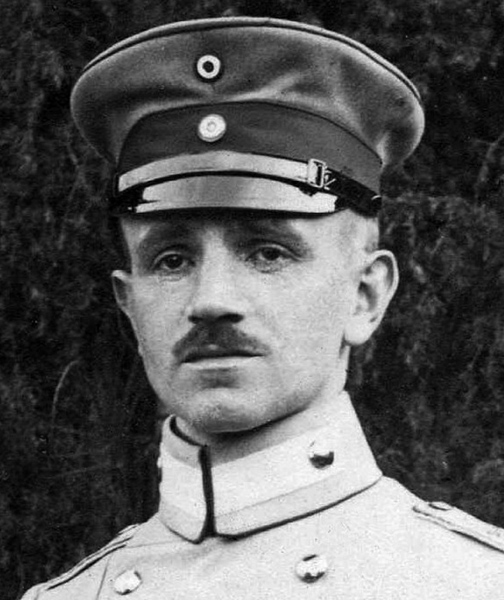
- Born: 1 March 1882; Bad Bevensen, Lower Saxony, Germany
- Died: 8 March 1972 (aged 90)
- Education: University of Göttingen
- Known for: Gas dynamics
- Spouse: Frieda Büscher
- Children: Hannelore Meyer (30 March 1924 – 25 August 1942)
- Scientific career
- Doctoral advisor: Ludwig Prandtl

Theodor Meyer (1 July 1882 – 8 March 1972) was a German mathematician born in Bad Bevensen, Germany. He was a protege of Ludwig Prandtl and is credited as one of the pioneers in the establishment of the scientific discipline known today as compressible flow or gas dynamics.

== Biography ==
As a youth, Meyer studied mathematics and physics. He learned from several prominent minds in these fields, including David Hilbert, Carl Runge, Hermann Minkowski, and Ludwig Prandtl. Meyer complemented Prandtl's intuitive and experimental approach to fluid mechanics with his own mathematical talent.

During the first decade of the 20th century, Meyer worked under Prandtl's guidance at the Georg-August University in Göttingen, Germany on the theory of supersonic gas flows, then a brand-new field of study that we now call compressible flow or gas dynamics. In particular, Meyer developed the theory for how gases traveling at supersonic speed slow down abruptly through oblique shock waves, and how they accelerate smoothly through what we now call a Prandtl–Meyer expansion fan. Prandtl first showed images of such flows captured by Schlieren photography, then the underlying theory appeared in Meyer's Ph.D. dissertation, hence the present terminology for the Prandtl–Meyer function and the Prandtl–Meyer expansion fan.

Although the names of Prandtl and Meyer are now universally connected with fans of expansion or compression waves in high-speed gas flows, their leading role in the discovery of oblique-shock waves has been forgotten. Present-day textbooks on compressible flow and gas dynamics simply present the oblique shock theory without attribution. The last textbook to properly acknowledge Prandtl and Meyer for oblique-shock theory was apparently written in 1947. Nonetheless, the Ph.D. dissertation of Theodor Meyer in 1908 is arguably one of the most influential in the entire field of fluid mechanics.

Until recently, nothing was known about Theodor Meyer's life after he finished his Ph.D. research in 1908. We now know that he served as a junior officer in the German infantry during World War I. He was injured in trench warfare on the infamous Western Front, and he came into contact with Fritz Haber, later a Nobel Prizewinner and now known as the "father of chemical warfare."

After the war, Meyer sought further employment in theoretical physics but could not find it in depression-era postwar Germany. Ludwig Prandtl was not financially able to hire him, but Meyer did design the de Laval nozzle for a supersonic wind tunnel that Prandtl wanted to build. Prandtl sought funding from the German military to build this advanced aerodynamic test facility, but he did not succeed.

Meyer subsequently worked as an engineer and as a high-school teacher of math and physics. By the time of his death at almost age 90 in 1972, not even his family or his neighbors in Bad Bevensen, Germany were aware of the formative role he had played, with Ludwig Prandtl, in the scientific discipline known as compressible flow or gas dynamics.
