= Riemann invariant =

Riemann invariants are mathematical transformations made on a system of conservation equations to make them more easily solvable. Riemann invariants are constant along the characteristic curves of the partial differential equations where they obtain the name invariant. They were first obtained by Bernhard Riemann in his work on plane waves in gas dynamics.

== Mathematical theory ==
Consider the set of conservation equations:

$$l_i\left(A_{ij} \frac{\partial u_j}{\partial t}  +a_{ij}\frac{\partial u_j}{\partial x}  \right)+l_j b_j=0$$

where $A_{ij}$ and $a_{ij}$ are the elements of the matrices $\mathbf{A}$ and $\mathbf{a}$ where $l_{i}$ and $b_{i}$ are elements of vectors. It will be asked if it is possible to rewrite this equation to

$$m_j\left(\beta\frac{\partial u_j}{\partial t}  +\alpha\frac{\partial u_j}{\partial x}  \right)+l_j b_j=0$$

To do this curves will be introduced in the $(x,t)$ plane defined by the vector field $(\alpha,\beta)$. The term in the brackets will be rewritten in terms of a total derivative where $x,t$ are parametrized as $x=X(\eta),t=T(\eta)$

$$\frac{d u_j}{d \eta}=T'\frac{\partial u_j}{\partial t}+X'\frac{\partial u_j}{\partial x}$$

comparing the last two equations we find

$$\alpha=X'(\eta), \beta=T'(\eta)$$

which can be now written in characteristic form

$$m_j\frac{du_j  }{ d \eta  }+l_jb_j = 0$$

where we must have the conditions

$$l_iA_{ij}=m_jT'$$
$$l_ia_{ij}=m_jX'$$

where $m_j$ can be eliminated to give the necessary condition

$$l_i(A_{ij}X'-a_{ij}T')=0$$

so for a nontrivial solution is the determinant

$$|A_{ij}X'-a_{ij}T'|=0$$

For Riemann invariants we are concerned with the case when the matrix $\mathbf{A}$ is an identity matrix to form

$$\frac{\partial u_i}{\partial t}  +a_{ij}\frac{\partial u_j}{\partial x}=0$$

notice this is homogeneous due to the vector $\mathbf{n}$ being zero. In characteristic form the system is

$l_i\frac{du_i }{dt }=0$ with $\frac{dx }{dt }=\lambda$

Where $l$ is the left eigenvector of the matrix $\mathbf{A}$ and $\lambda 's$ is the characteristic speeds of the eigenvalues of the matrix $\mathbf{A}$ which satisfy

$$|A -\lambda\delta_{ij}|=0$$

To simplify these characteristic equations we can make the transformations such that $\frac{dr}{dt}=l_i\frac{du_i}{dt}$

which form

$$\mu l_idu_i =dr$$

An integrating factor $\mu$ can be multiplied in to help integrate this. So the system now has the characteristic form

$\frac{dr}{dt }=0$ on $\frac{dx}{dt}=\lambda_i$

which is equivalent to the diagonal system

$r_t^k +\lambda_kr_x^k=0,$ $k=1,...,N.$

The solution of this system can be given by the generalized hodograph method.

== Example ==
Consider the one-dimensional Euler equations written in terms of density $\rho$ and velocity $u$ are

$$\rho_t+\rho u_x+u\rho_x=0$$
$$u_t+uu_x+(c^2/\rho)\rho_x=0$$

with $c$ being the speed of sound is introduced on account of isentropic assumption. Write this system in matrix form

$$\left( \begin{matrix} \rho\\ u \end{matrix}\right)_t +\left( \begin{matrix} u&\rho\\ \frac{c^2 }{\rho }&u \end{matrix}\right) \left( \begin{matrix} \rho\\ u \end{matrix}\right)_x=\left( \begin{matrix} 0\\ 0 \end{matrix}\right)$$

where the matrix $\mathbf{a}$ from the analysis above the eigenvalues and eigenvectors need to be found. The eigenvalues are found to satisfy

$$\lambda^2-2u\lambda+u^2-c^2=0$$

to give

$$\lambda=u\pm c$$

and the eigenvectors are found to be

$$\left( \begin{matrix} 1\\ \frac{c }{\rho } \end{matrix}\right),\left( \begin{matrix} 1\\ -\frac{c }{\rho } \end{matrix}\right)$$

where the Riemann invariants are

$$r_1=J_+=u+\int \frac{c}{\rho}d\rho,$$
$$r_2=J_-=u-\int \frac{c}{\rho}d\rho,$$

($J_+$ and $J_-$ are the widely used notations in gas dynamics). For perfect gas with constant specific heats, there is the relation $c^2=\text{const}\, \gamma \rho^{\gamma-1}$, where $\gamma$ is the specific heat ratio, to give the Riemann invariants

$$J_+=u+\frac{2}{\gamma-1}c,$$
$$J_-=u-\frac{2}{\gamma-1}c,$$

to give the equations

$$\frac{\partial J_+}{\partial t}+(u+c)\frac{\partial J_+}{\partial x}=0$$
$$\frac{\partial J_-}{\partial t}+(u-c)\frac{\partial J_-}{\partial x}=0$$

In other words,

$$\begin{align}
&dJ_+ = 0, \, J_+=\text{const}\quad \text{along}\,\, C_+\, :\, \frac{dx}{dt}=u+c, \\
&dJ_- = 0, \, J_-=\text{const}\quad \text{along}\,\, C_-\, :\, \frac{dx}{dt}=u-c,
\end{align}$$

where $C_+$ and $C_-$ are the characteristic curves. This can be solved by the hodograph transformation. In the hodographic plane, if all the characteristics collapses into a single curve, then we obtain simple waves. If the matrix form of the system of pde's is in the form

$$A\frac{\partial v}{\partial t}+B\frac{\partial v}{\partial x}=0$$

Then it may be possible to multiply across by the inverse matrix $A^{-1}$ so long as the matrix determinant of $\mathbf{A}$ is not zero.

== See also ==
- Simple wave
