= Simple wave =

Flow in region adjacent to constant-state region

A simple wave is a flow in a region adjacent to a region of constant state. In the language of Riemann invariant, the simple wave can also be defined as the zone where all but one of the Riemann invariants are constant in the region of interest, and consequently, a simple wave zone is covered by arcs of characteristics that are straight lines.

Simple waves occur quite often in nature. There is a theorem (see Courant and Friedrichs) that states that a non-constant state of flow adjacent to a constant value is always a simple wave. All expansion fans including Prandtl–Meyer expansion fan are simple waves. Compressive waves until shock wave forms are also simple waves. Weak shocks (including sound waves) are also simple waves up to second-order approximation in the shock strength.

Simple waves are also defined by the behavior that all the characteristics under hodograph transformation collapses into a single curve. This means that the Jacobian involved in the hodographic transformation is zero.

== Unsteady one-dimensional simple waves ==
Let $\rho$ be the gas density, $u$ the velocity, $p$ the pressure and $c=\sqrt{(\partial p/\partial \rho)_s}$ the speed of sound. In isentropic flows, entropy $s$ is constant and if the initial state of the gas is homogenous, then entropy is a constant everywhere at all times and therefore the pressure is a function only of $\rho$, i.e., $p=p(\rho)$ In simple waves, all dependent variables are just function of any one of the dependent variables (this is certainly the case in one-dimensional sound waves) and therefore we can assume the velocity to be also a function only of $\rho$. i.e., $u=u(\rho).$ This latter property is the cause of origin of the name simple wave, although the wave is nonlinear.

From the one-dimensional Euler equations, we have

$$\frac{\partial \rho}{\partial t} + \frac{\partial (\rho u)}{\partial x} =0$$
$$\frac{\partial u}{\partial t} + u \frac{\partial u}{\partial x} + \frac{1}{\rho}\frac{\partial p}{\partial x}=0$$

which, because $u=u(\rho)$, can be written as

$$\frac{\partial \rho}{\partial t} + \frac{d(\rho u)}{d\rho}\frac{\partial \rho }{\partial x} =0$$
$$\frac{\partial u}{\partial t} + \left(u+\frac{1}{\rho}\frac{dp}{du}\right) \frac{\partial u}{\partial x} =0.$$

Further, since (remember that the time derivative of a function $f(x,t)$ integrated along a curve $x=\varphi(t)$ is given by $(df/dt)_\varphi = \partial f/\partial t + (dx/dt)_\varphi\partial f/\partial x$)

$$\frac{\partial \rho/\partial t}{\partial \rho/\partial x} = - \left(\frac{\partial x}{\partial t}\right)_\rho, \quad \frac{\partial u/\partial t}{\partial u/\partial x} = - \left(\frac{\partial x}{\partial t}\right)_u,$$

the two equations lead to

$$\left(\frac{\partial x}{\partial t}\right)_\rho= \frac{d(\rho u)}{d\rho}= u + \rho \frac{du}{d\rho}, \quad \left(\frac{\partial x}{\partial t}\right)_u = u + \frac{1}{\rho}\frac{dp}{du}.$$

However, since $\rho$ determines $u$ and therefore the above derivatives must be equal so that $\rho du/d\rho=(1/\rho)dp/du=(c^2/\rho)d\rho/du$. Thus, we obtain $du/d\rho=\pm c/\rho$, whence

$$u = \pm \int \frac{c}{\rho}d\rho = \pm \int \frac{dp}{\rho c}.$$

This equation provides the required relation $u=u(\rho)$ or, $c=c(u)$ or, $u=u(p)$ etc. The above equation is just a statement that either the $J_+$ or the $J_-$ Riemann invariant is constant.

Thus, we obtain

$$\left(\frac{\partial x}{\partial t}\right)_u = u \pm c(u)$$,

which upon integration becomes

$$x = t[u \pm c(u)] + f(u)$$

where $f(u)$ is an arbitrary function. This equation indicates that the characteristics in the $x$-$t$ plane are just straight lines. When $f(u)=0$ and when consequently length scale and time scale associated with the initial function disappears, the problem is self-similar and the solution depends only on the ratio $x/t$. This particular case is referred as the centred simple wave.

== Steady two-dimensional simple waves ==
Similar to the unsteady one-dimensional waves, simple waves in steady two-dimensional system cab be derived. In this case, the solution is given by

$$y = xf_1(p) + f_2(p)$$

where $f_1(p) = (\partial y/\partial x)_p$ and $f_2(p)$ is an arbitrary function of pressure. The characteristics in the $x$-$y$ plane are straight lines. Similarly, the case corresponding to $f_2(p)=0$ is referred as the centred simple wave; the Prandtl–Meyer expansion fan is a special case of this centred wave.
