= Prandtl–Meyer expansion fan =

Phenomenon in fluid dynamics

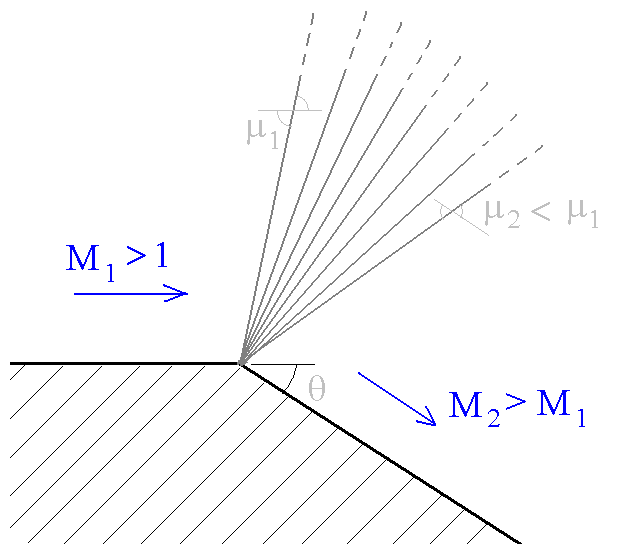
When a supersonic flow encounters a convex corner, it forms an expansion fan, which consists of an infinite number of expansion waves centred at the corner. The figure shows one such ideal expansion fan.

A Prandtl-Meyer expansion fan is a two-dimensional simple wave that occurs when a supersonic flow turns around a sharp convex corner. The fan consists of an infinite number of Mach waves, diverging from a sharp corner. Prandtl-Meyer expansions are a subset of centered waves, where all the Mach waves can be extended to meet at a point, regardless of whether that point is along the wall.

Each wave in the expansion fan turns the flow gradually (in small steps). It is physically impossible for the flow to turn through a single "shock" wave because this would violate the second law of thermodynamics.

Across the expansion fan, the flow accelerates (velocity increases) and the Mach number increases, while the static pressure, temperature and density decrease. Since the process is isentropic, the stagnation properties (e.g. the total pressure and total temperature) remain constant across the fan.

The theory was described by Theodor Meyer on his thesis dissertation in 1908, along with his advisor Ludwig Prandtl, who had already discussed the problem a year before.

== Flow properties ==
The expansion fan consists of an infinite number of expansion waves or Mach lines. The first Mach line is at an angle $\mu_1 = \arcsin \left( \frac{1}{M_1} \right)$ with respect to the flow direction, and the last Mach line is at an angle $\mu_2 = \arcsin \left( \frac{1}{M_2} \right)$ with respect to final flow direction. Since the flow turns in small angles and the changes across each expansion wave are small, the whole process is isentropic. This simplifies the calculations of the flow properties significantly. Since the flow is isentropic, the stagnation properties like stagnation pressure ($p_0$), stagnation temperature ($T_0$) and stagnation density ($\rho_0$) remain constant. The final static properties are a function of the final flow Mach number ($M_2$) and can be related to the initial flow conditions as follows, where $\gamma$ is the heat capacity ratio of the gas (1.4 for air):

$$\begin{align}
\frac{T_2}{T_1} &= \left( \frac{1 + \frac{\gamma - 1}{2}M_1^2}{1 + \frac{\gamma - 1}{2}M_2^2} \right) \\[3pt]
\frac{p_2}{p_1} &= \left( \frac{1 + \frac{\gamma - 1}{2}M_1^2}{1 + \frac{\gamma - 1}{2}M_2^2} \right)^\frac{\gamma}{\gamma - 1} \\[3pt]
\frac{\rho_2}{\rho_1} &= \left( \frac{1 + \frac{\gamma - 1}{2}M_1^2}{1 + \frac{\gamma - 1}{2}M_2^2} \right)^\frac{1}{\gamma - 1}.
\end{align}$$

The Mach number after the turn ($M_2$) is related to the initial Mach number ($M_1$) and the turn angle ($\theta$) by,

$$\theta = \nu(M_2) - \nu(M_1) \,$$

where, $\nu(M) \,$ is the Prandtl–Meyer function. This function determines the angle through which a sonic flow (M = 1) must turn to reach a particular Mach number (M). Mathematically,

$$\begin{align}
\nu(M)
&= \int \frac{\sqrt{M^2 - 1}}{1 + \frac{\gamma - 1}{2}M^2}\frac{\,dM}{M} \\
&= \sqrt{\frac{\gamma + 1}{\gamma - 1}} \arctan \sqrt{\frac{\gamma - 1}{\gamma + 1} \left(M^2 - 1\right)} - \arctan\sqrt{M^2 - 1}. \\
\end{align}$$

By convention, $\nu(1) = 0. \,$

Thus, given the initial Mach number ($M_1$), one can calculate $\nu(M_1) \,$ and using the turn angle find $\nu(M_2) \,$. From the value of $\nu(M_2) \,$ one can obtain the final Mach number ($M_2$) and the other flow properties. The velocity field in the expansion fan, expressed in polar coordinates $(r,\phi)$ are given by

$$v_r = \sqrt{2(h_0-h)-c^2}, \quad v_\phi=c, \quad \text{where} \quad \phi = - \int \frac{d(\rho c)}{\rho \sqrt{2(h_0-h)-c^2}},$$

$h$ is the specific enthalpy and $h_0$ is the stagnation specific enthalpy.

== Maximum turn angle ==
There is a limit on the maximum angle ($\theta_\text{max}$) through which a supersonic flow can turn. The streamline separating the flow from the wall is known as a slipstream (dashed line).

As Mach number varies from 1 to $\infty$, $\nu \,$ takes values from 0 to $\nu_\text{max} \,$, where

$$\nu_\text{max} = \frac{\pi}{2} \left( \sqrt{\frac{\gamma + 1}{\gamma - 1}} - 1 \right).$$

This places a limit on how much a supersonic flow can turn through, with the maximum turn angle given by,

$$\theta_\text{max} = \nu_\text{max} - \nu(M_1). \,$$

One can also look at it as follows. A flow has to turn so that it can satisfy the boundary conditions. In an ideal flow, there are two kinds of boundary condition that the flow has to satisfy,

1. Velocity boundary condition, which dictates that the component of the flow velocity normal to the wall be zero. It is also known as no-penetration boundary condition.
2. Pressure boundary condition, which states that there cannot be a discontinuity in the static pressure inside the flow (since there are no shocks in the flow).

If the flow turns enough so that it becomes parallel to the wall, we do not need to worry about pressure boundary condition. However, as the flow turns, its static pressure decreases (as described earlier). If there is not enough pressure to start with, the flow won't be able to complete the turn and will not be parallel to the wall. This shows up as the maximum angle through which a flow can turn. The lower the Mach number is to start with (i.e. small $M_1$), the greater the maximum angle through which the flow can turn.

The streamline which separates the final flow direction and the wall is known as a slipstream (shown as the dashed line in the figure). Across this line there is a jump in the temperature, density and tangential component of the velocity (normal component being zero). Beyond the slipstream the flow is stagnant (which automatically satisfies the velocity boundary condition at the wall). In case of real flow, a shear layer is observed instead of a slipstream, because of the additional no-slip boundary condition.

== See also ==
- Gas dynamics
- Mach wave
- Oblique shock
- Shock wave
- Shadowgraph technique
- Schlieren photography
- Sonic boom
