= Prandtl–Meyer function =

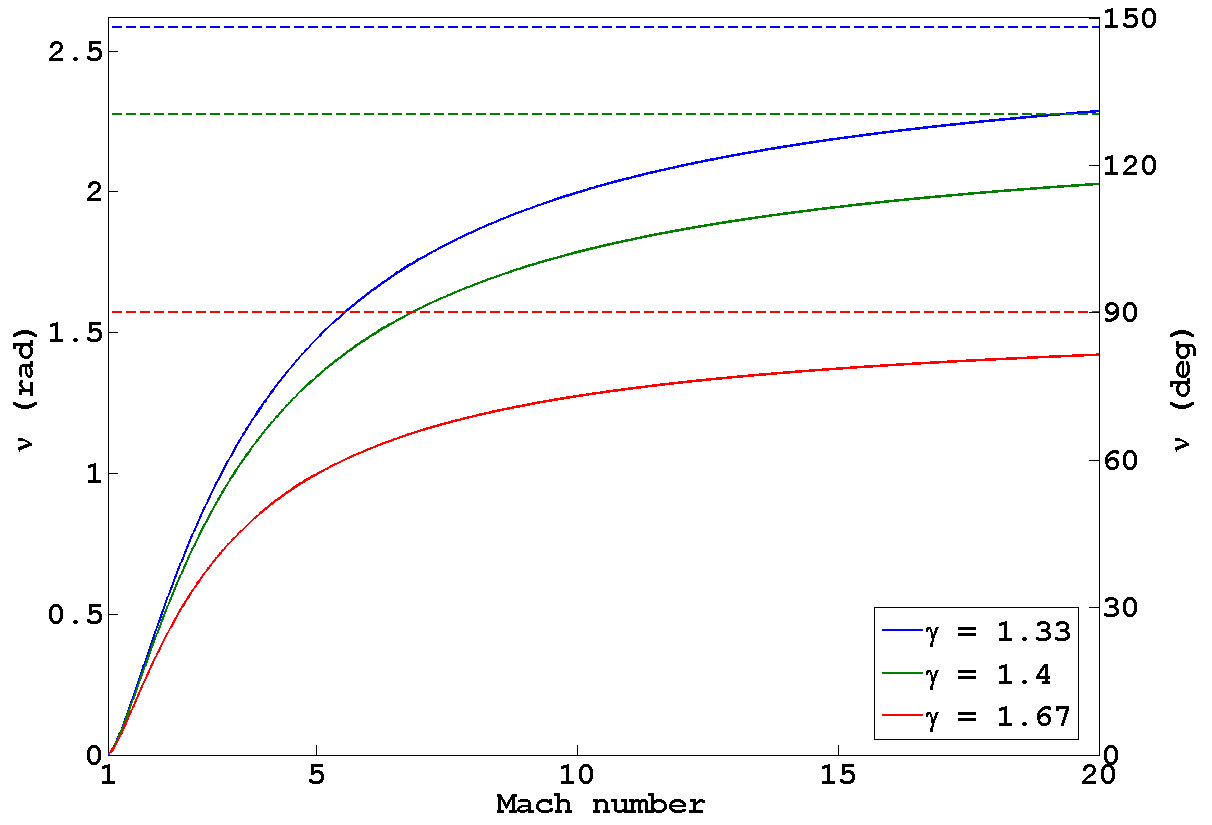
Variation in the Prandtl–Meyer function ($\nu$) with Mach number ($M$) and ratio of specific heat capacity ($\gamma$). The dashed lines show the limiting value $\nu_\text{max}$ as Mach number tends to infinity.

In aerodynamics, the Prandtl–Meyer function describes the angle through which a flow turns isentropically from sonic velocity (M=1) to a Mach (M) number greater than 1. The maximum angle through which a sonic (M = 1) flow can be turned around a convex corner is calculated for M = $\infty$. For an ideal gas, it is expressed as follows,

$$\begin{align} \nu(M)
& = \int \frac{\sqrt{M^2-1}}{1+\frac{\gamma -1}{2}M^2}\frac{\,dM}{M} \\[4pt]
& = \sqrt{\frac{\gamma + 1}{\gamma -1}} \cdot \arctan \sqrt{\frac{\gamma -1}{\gamma +1} (M^2 -1)} - \arctan \sqrt{M^2 -1}
\end{align}$$

where $\nu \,$ is the Prandtl–Meyer function, $M$ is the Mach number of the flow and $\gamma$ is the ratio of the specific heat capacities.

By convention, the constant of integration is selected such that $\nu(1) = 0. \,$

As Mach number varies from 1 to $\infty$, $\nu \,$ takes values from 0 to $\nu_\text{max} \,$, where

$$\nu_\text{max} = \frac{\pi}{2} \bigg( \sqrt{\frac{\gamma+1}{\gamma-1}} -1 \bigg)$$

For isentropic expansion,	$\nu(M_2) = \nu(M_1) + \theta \,$
For isentropic compression,	$\nu(M_2) = \nu(M_1) - \theta \,$

where, $\theta$ is the absolute value of the angle through which the flow turns, $M$ is the flow Mach number and the suffixes "1" and "2" denote the initial and final conditions respectively.

== See also ==
- Gas dynamics
- Prandtl–Meyer expansion fan
