= Mach wave =

Pressure wave

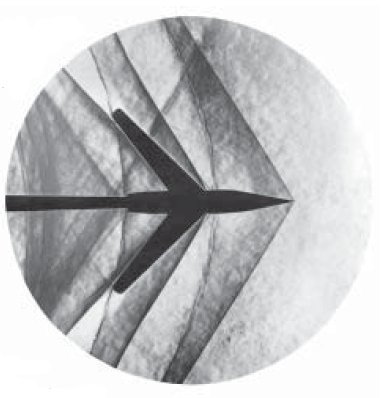
Schlieren photograph of an attached shock on a sharp-nosed supersonic body. The Mach angle is acute, showing that the body exceeds Mach 1. The angle of the Mach wave (~59 degrees) indicates a velocity of about Mach 1.17.

In fluid dynamics, a Mach wave, also known as a weak discontinuity, is a pressure wave traveling with the speed of sound caused by a slight change of pressure added to a compressible flow. These weak waves can combine in supersonic flow to become a shock wave if sufficient Mach waves are present at any location. Such a shock wave is called a Mach stem or Mach front. Thus, it is possible to have shockless compression or expansion in a supersonic flow by having the production of Mach waves sufficiently spaced (cf. isentropic compression in supersonic flows). A Mach wave is the weak limit of an oblique shock wave where time averages of flow quantities don't change (a normal shock is the other limit). If the size of the object moving at the speed of sound is near 0, then this domain of influence of the wave is called a Mach cone.

== Mach angle ==
A sonic boom produced by an aircraft moving at M=2.92, calculated from the cone angle of 20 degrees. Observers hear nothing until the shock wave, on the edges of the cone, crosses their location.

A Mach wave propagates across the flow at the Mach angle μ, which is the angle formed between the Mach wave wavefront and a vector that points opposite to the vector of motion. It is given by

$$\mu = \arcsin\left(\frac{1}{M}\right),$$

where M is the Mach number.

Mach waves can be used in schlieren or shadowgraph observations to determine the local Mach number of the flow. Early observations by Ernst Mach used grooves in the wall of a duct to produce Mach waves in a duct, which were then photographed by the schlieren method, to obtain data about the flow in nozzles and ducts. Mach angles may also occasionally be visualized out of their condensation in air, for example vapor cones around aircraft during transonic flight.

== See also ==
- Compressible flow
- Prandtl–Meyer expansion fan
- Shadowgraph technique
- Schlieren photography
- Shock wave
