= Fan (machine) =

Machine used to produce air flow

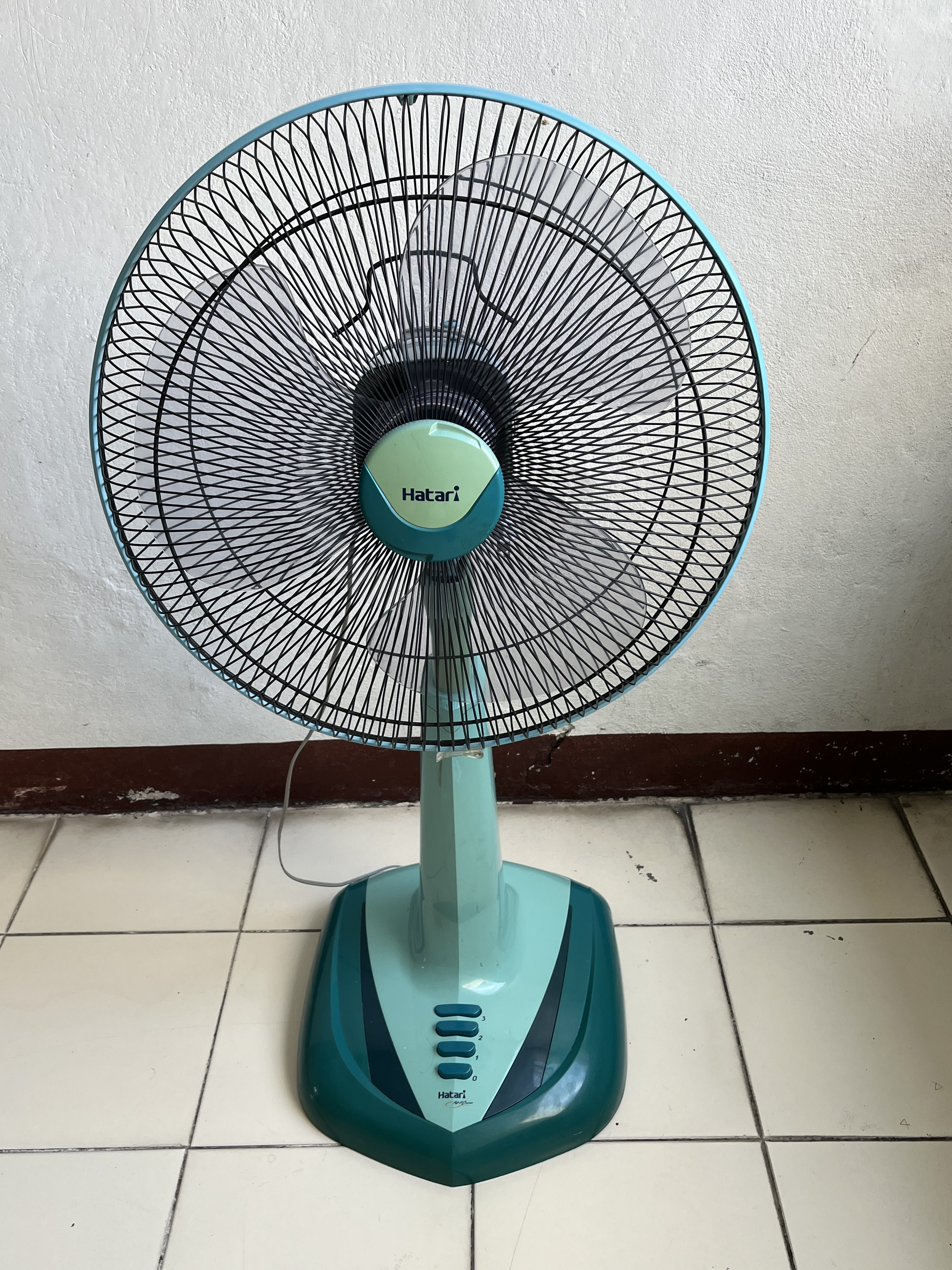
A household electric fan

A fan is a powered machine that creates airflow. A fan consists of rotating vanes or blades, generally made of wood, plastic, or metal, which act on the air. The rotating assembly of blades and hub is known as an impeller, rotor, or runner. Usually, it is contained within some form of housing, or case. This housing will allow air to pass through as well as directing the airflow, or increasing safety by preventing objects from contacting the fan blades. Most fans are powered by electric motors, but other sources of power may be used, including hydraulic motors, handcranks, and internal combustion engines.

Mechanically, a fan can be any revolving vane, or vanes used for producing currents of air. Fans produce air flows with high volume and low pressure (although higher than ambient pressure), as opposed to compressors which produce high pressures at a comparatively low volume. A fan blade will often rotate when exposed to an air-fluid stream, and devices that take advantage of this, such as anemometers and wind turbines, often have designs similar to that of a fan.

Typical applications include climate control and personal thermal comfort (e.g., an electric table or floor fan), vehicle engine cooling systems (e.g., in front of a radiator), machinery cooling systems (e.g., inside computers and audio power amplifiers), ventilation, fume extraction, winnowing (e.g., separating chaff from cereal grains), removing dust (e.g. sucking as in a vacuum cleaner), drying (usually in combination with a heat source) and providing draft for a fire. Some fans may be indirectly used for cooling in the case of industrial heat exchangers.

While fans are effective at cooling people, they do not cool air. Instead, they work by evaporative cooling of sweat and increased heat convection into the surrounding air due to the airflow from the fans. Thus, fans may become less effective at cooling the body if the surrounding air is near body temperature and contains high humidity.

== History ==
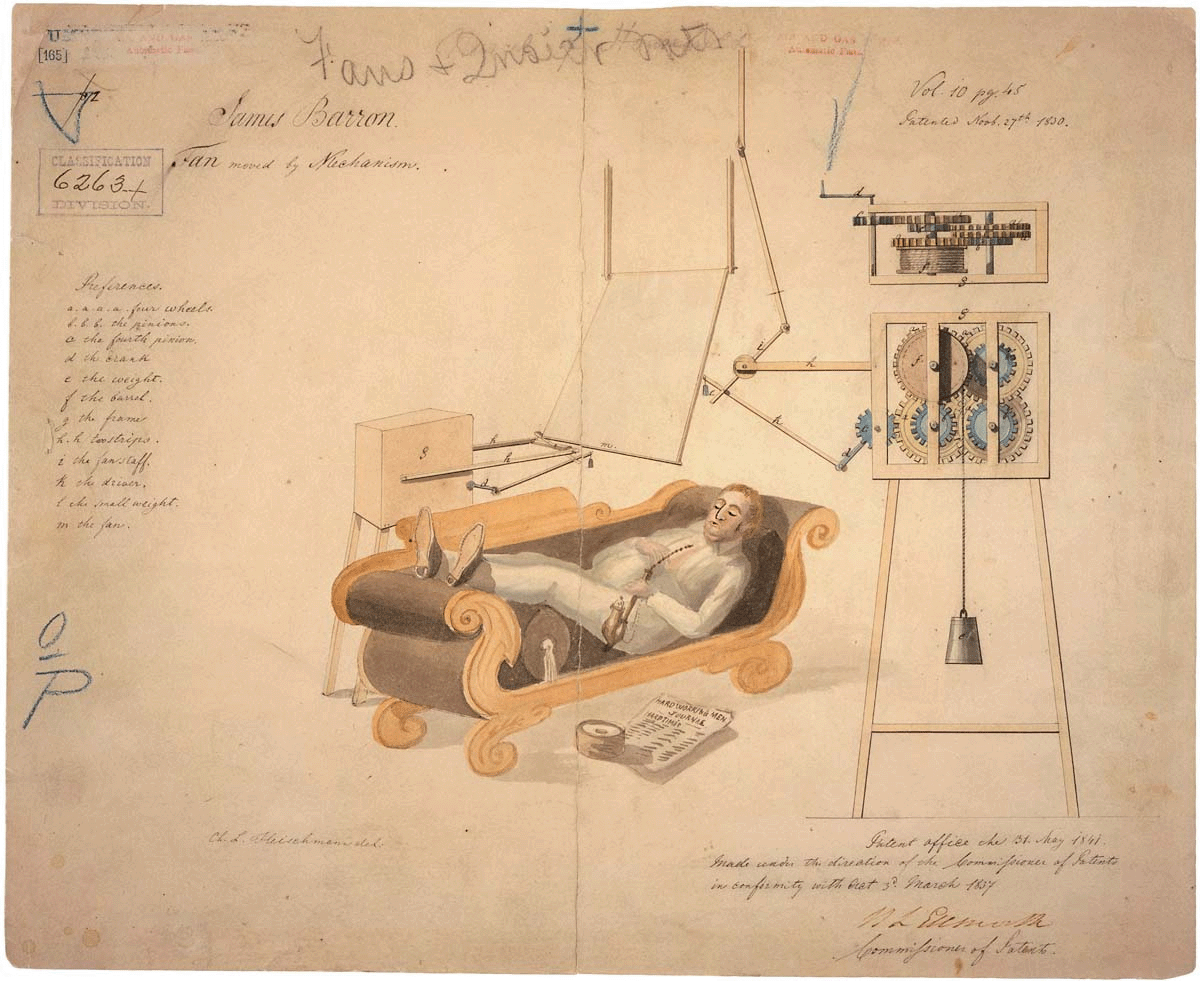
Patent drawing for a Fan Moved by Mechanism, invented by James Barron, November 27, 1830

Fans made with leaves were prevalent in ancient Egypt and India. In ancient India, they were handheld fans made from bamboo strips or other plant fiber, that could be rotated or fanned to move air. During British rule, the word came to be used by Anglo-Indians to mean a large swinging flat fan, fixed to the ceiling and pulled by a servant called the punkawallah.

For purposes of air conditioning, the Han dynasty craftsman and engineer Ding Huan (fl. 180 CE) invented a manually operated rotary fan with seven wheels that measured 3 m (10 ft) in diameter; in the 8th century, during the Tang dynasty (618–907), the Chinese applied hydraulic power to rotate the fan wheels for air conditioning, while the rotary fan became even more common during the Song dynasty (960–1279).

During the Heian period (794–1185) in Japan, fans adapted the role of symbolizing social class as well as a mechanical role. The tessen, a Japanese fan used in feudal times, was a dangerous weapon hidden in plain sight in the shape of a regular fan, a weapon used by samurais when katanas were not ideal.

In the 17th century, the experiments of scientists, including Otto von Guericke, Robert Hooke, and Robert Boyle, established the basic principles of vacuum and airflow. The English architect Sir Christopher Wren applied an early ventilation system in the Houses of Parliament that used bellows to circulate air. Wren's design was the catalyst for much later improvement and innovation. The first rotary fan used in Europe was for mine ventilation during the 16th century, as illustrated by Georg Agricola (1494–1555).

John Theophilus Desaguliers, a British engineer, demonstrated the successful use of a fan system to draw out stagnant air from coal mines in 1727—ventilation was essential in coal mines to prevent asphyxiation—and soon afterward he installed a similar apparatus in Parliament. The civil engineer John Smeaton, and later John Buddle, installed reciprocating air pumps in the mines in the North of England, though the machinery was liable to breaking down.

=== Steam ===
In 1849 a 6 m radius steam-driven fan, designed by William Brunton, was made operational in the Gelly Gaer Colliery of South Wales. The model was exhibited at the Great Exhibition of 1851. Also in 1851 David Boswell Reid, a Scottish doctor installed four steam-powered fans in the ceiling of St George's Hospital in Liverpool so that the pressure produced by the fans would force the incoming air upward and through vents in the ceiling. Improvements in the technology were made by James Nasmyth, Frenchman Theophile Guibal and J. R. Waddle.

=== Electrical ===
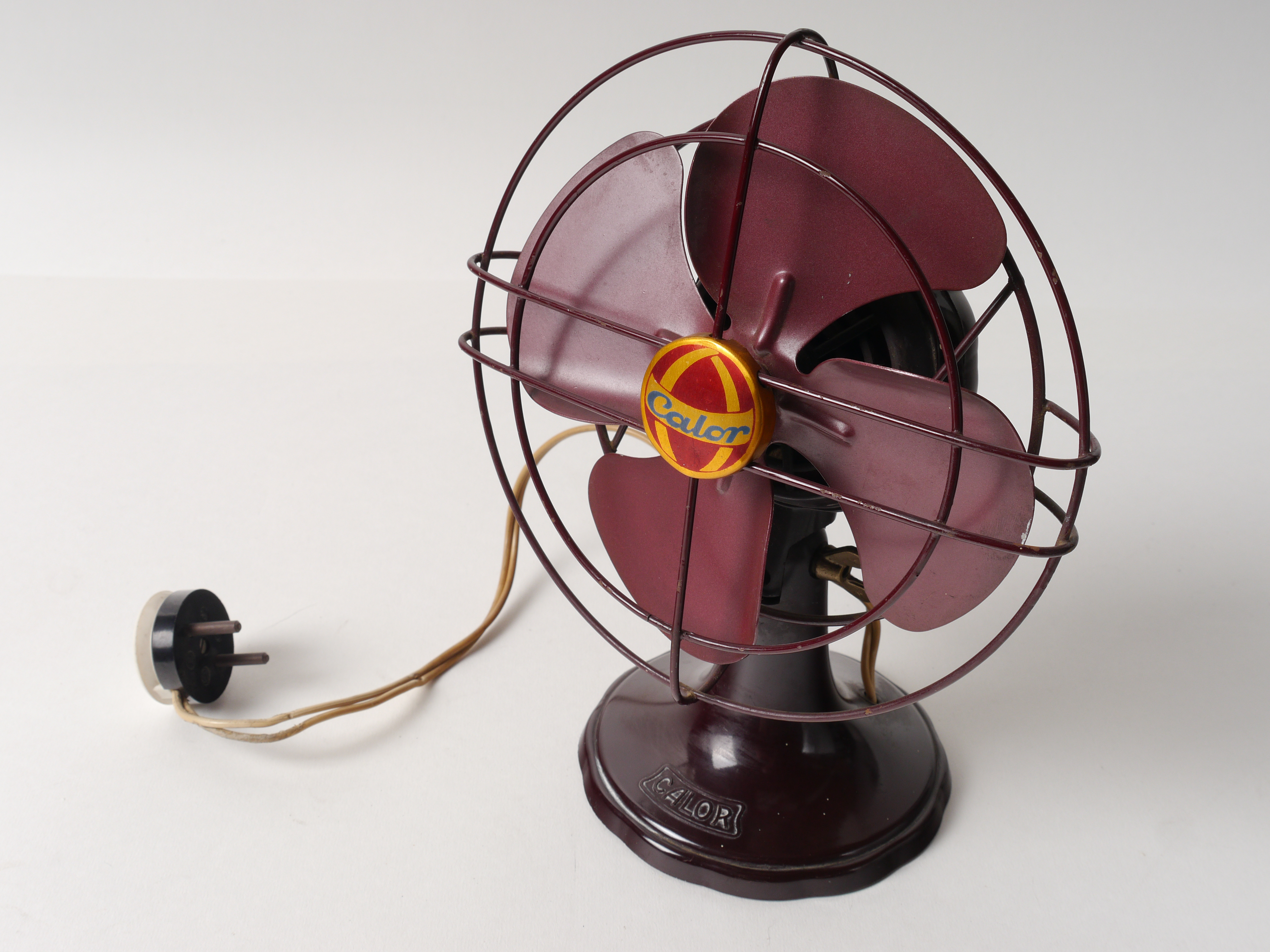
Electric fan in Bakelite, collection of the Museum of Industry (Ghent, Belgium)

Between 1882 and 1886 Schuyler Wheeler invented a fan powered by electricity. It was commercially marketed by the American firm Crocker & Curtis electric motor company. In 1885 a desktop direct drive electric fan was commercially available by Stout, Meadowcraft & Co. in New York.

In 1882, Philip Diehl developed the world's first electric ceiling mounted fan. During this intense period of innovation, fans powered by alcohol, oil, or kerosene were common around the turn of the 20th century.

In 1909, KDK of Japan pioneered the invention of mass-produced electric fans for home use. In the 1920s, industrial advances allowed steel fans to be mass-produced in different shapes, bringing fan prices down and allowing more homeowners to afford them. In the 1930s, the first art deco fan (the "Silver Swan") was designed by Emerson. By the 1940s, Crompton Greaves of India became the world's largest manufacturer of electric ceiling fans mainly for sale in India, Asia, and the Middle East. By the 1950s, table and stand fans were manufactured in bright colors and were eye-catching. Ceiling fans are extremely popular in South Asian countries such as India, where they provide cost-effective cooling in hot climates.

Window and central air conditioning in the 1960s caused many companies to discontinue production of fans, but in the mid-1970s, with an increasing awareness of the cost of electricity and the amount of energy used to heat and cool homes, turn-of-the-century styled ceiling fans became popular again as both decorative and energy-efficient.

In 1998 William Fairbank and Walter K. Boyd invented the high-volume low-speed (HVLS) ceiling fan, designed to reduce energy consumption by using long fan blades rotating at low speed to move a relatively large volume of air.

== Types ==
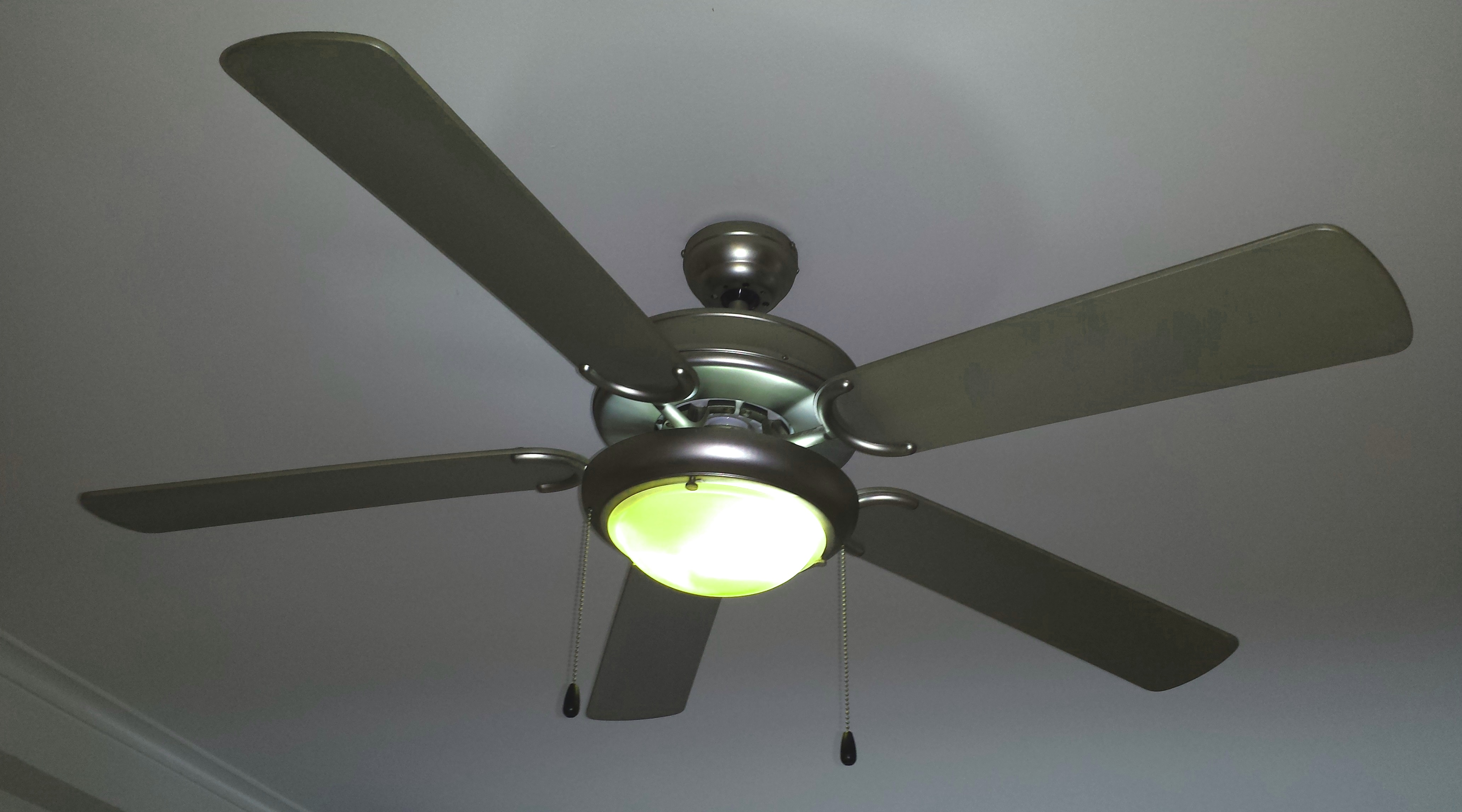
Ceiling fan with an electric light

Mechanical revolving blade fans are made in a wide range of designs. They are used on the floor, table, desk, or hung from the ceiling (ceiling fan) and can be built into a window, wall, roof, etc. Tower fans tend to have smaller blades inside. Electronic systems generating significant heat, such as computers, incorporate fans. Appliances such as hair dryers and space heaters also use fans. They move air in air-conditioning systems and in automotive engines. Fans used for comfort inside a room create a wind chill by increasing the heat transfer coefficient but do not lower temperatures directly. Fans used to cool electrical equipment or in engines or other machines cool the equipment directly by exhausting hot air into the cooler environment outside of the machine so that cooler air flows in. Three main types of fans are used for moving air, axial, centrifugal (also called radial) and cross flow (also called tangential). The American Society of Mechanical Engineers (ASME) Performance Testing Code (PTC) 11 provides standard procedures for conducting and reporting tests on fans, including those of the centrifugal, axial, and mixed flows.

=== Axial-flow ===
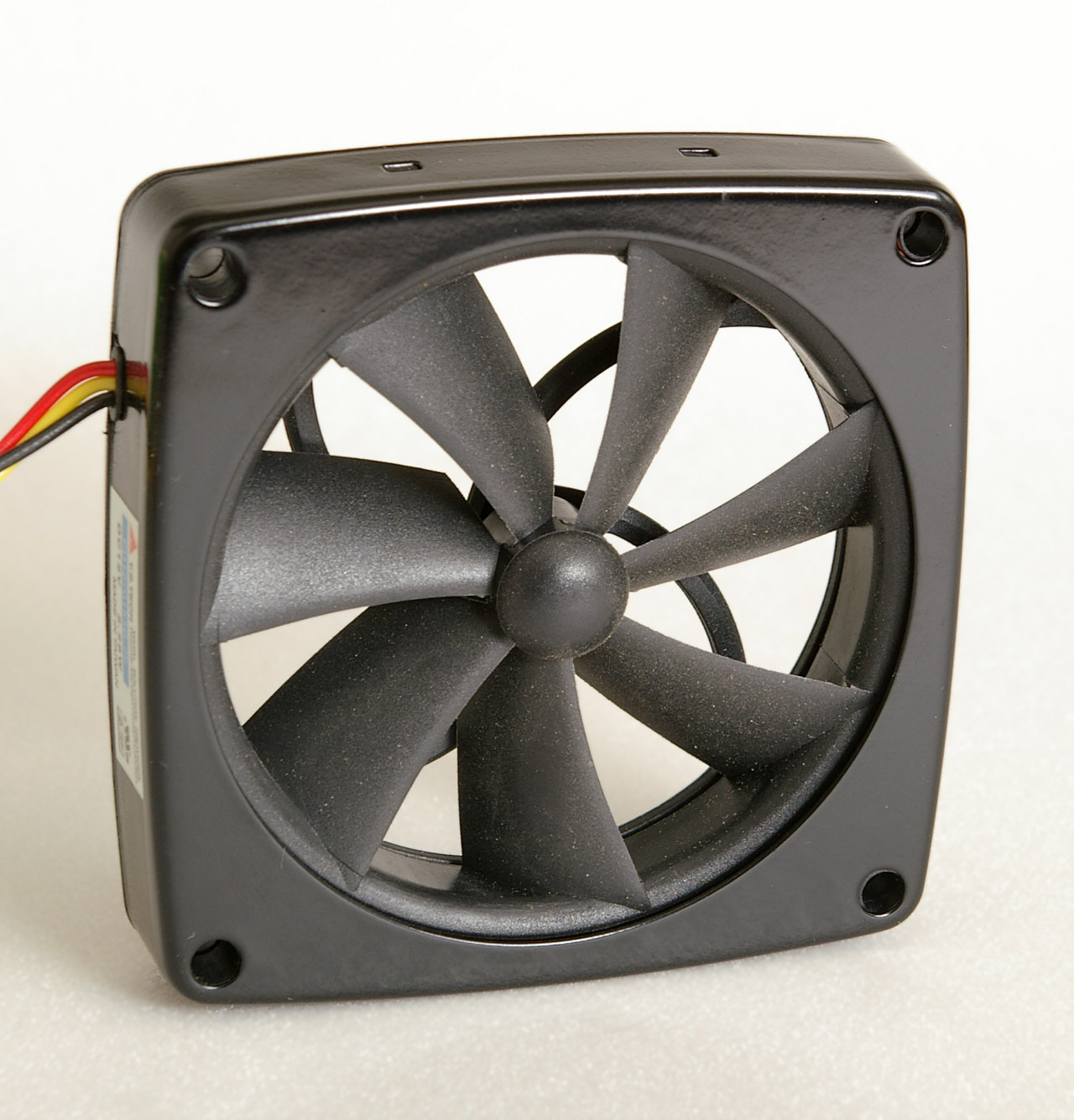
An axial box fan for cooling electrical equipment

Axial-flow fans have blades that force air to move parallel to the shaft about which the blades rotate. This type of fan is used in a wide variety of applications, ranging from small cooling fans for electronics to the giant fans used in cooling towers. Axial flow fans are applied in air conditioning and industrial process applications. Standard axial flow fans have diameters of 300–400 mm or 1,800–2,000 mm and work under pressures up to 800 Pa. Special types of fans are used as low-pressure compressor stages in aircraft engines. Examples of axial fans are:

- Table fan: Basic elements of a typical table fan include the fan blade, base, armature, and lead wires, motor, blade guard, motor housing, oscillator gearbox, and oscillator shaft. The oscillator is a mechanism that motions the fan from side to side. The armature axle shaft comes out on both ends of the motor; one end of the shaft is attached to the blade, and the other is attached to the oscillator gearbox. The motor case joins the gearbox to contain the rotor and stator. The oscillator shaft combines the weighted base and the gearbox. A motor housing covers the oscillator mechanism. The blade guard joins the motor case for safety.
- Domestic extractor fan: Wall- or ceiling-mounted, the domestic extractor fan is employed to remove moisture and stale air from domestic dwellings. Bathroom extractor fans typically utilize a four-inch (100 mm) impeller, while kitchen extractor fans typically use a six-inch (150 mm) impeller as the room is often bigger. Axial fans with five-inch (125 mm) impellers are also used in larger bathrooms, though they are much less common. Domestic axial extractor fans are unsuitable for duct runs over 3 m or 4 m, depending on the number of bends in the run, as the increased air pressure in longer pipework inhibits the fan's performance.
- Continuous running extractor fans run continuously at a very slow rate, running fast when necessary, for example when a bathroom light is switched on. At working speed, they are just normal extractor fans. They extract typically 5 to 10 l/sec at continuous speed and use little electricity, 1 or 2 watts, for low annual cost. Some have humidity sensors to control trickle operation. They have the advantage of ensuring ventilation and preventing the build-up of humidity. Alternatively, a normal extractor fan may be fitted to operate intermittently at full power for the same purpose.
- Electro-mechanical fans: Among collectors, are rated according to their condition, size, age, and number of blades. Four-blade designs are the most common. Five-blade or six-blade designs are rare. The materials from which the components are made, such as brass, are important factors in fan desirability.
- A ceiling fan is a fan suspended from the ceiling of a room. Most ceiling fans rotate at relatively low speeds and do not have blade guards because they are inaccessible and unwieldy. Ceiling fans are used in both residential and industrial/commercial settings.
- In automobiles, a mechanical or electrically driven fan provides engine cooling and prevents the engine from overheating by blowing or drawing air through a coolant-filled radiator. The fan may be driven with a belt and pulley off the engine's crankshaft or an electric motor switched on or off by a thermostatic switch.
- Computer fan for cooling electrical components and in laptop coolers.
- Fans inside audio power amplifiers help to draw heat away from the electrical components.
- Variable pitch fan: A variable-pitch fan is used to precisely control static pressure within supply ducts. The blades are arranged to rotate upon a control-pitch hub. The fan wheel will spin at a constant speed. The blades follow the control pitch hub. As the hub moves toward the rotor, the blades increase their angle of attack, and an increase in flow results.

=== Centrifugal ===
Often called a "squirrel cage" (because of its general similarity in appearance to exercise wheels for pet rodents) or "scroll fan", the centrifugal fan has a moving component (called an impeller) that consists of a central shaft about which a set of blades that form a spiral, or ribs, are positioned. Centrifugal fans blow air at right angles to the intake of the fan and spin the air outwards to the outlet (by deflection and centrifugal force). The impeller rotates, causing air to enter the fan near the shaft and move perpendicularly from the shaft to the opening in the scroll-shaped fan casing. A centrifugal fan produces more pressure for a given air volume, and is used where this is desirable such as in leaf blowers, blowdryers, air mattress inflators, inflatable structures, climate control in air handling units and various industrial purposes. They are typically noisier than comparable axial fans (although some types of centrifugal fans are quieter such as in air handling units).

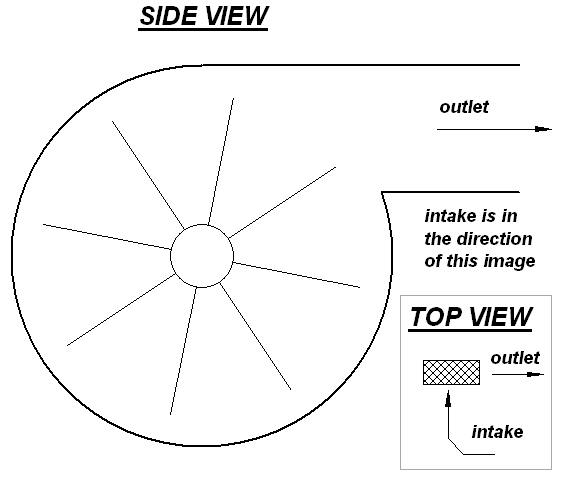
A diagram of a centrifugal fan, with a top view to show airflow

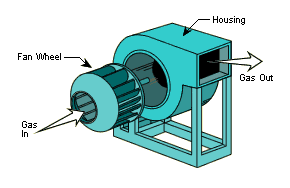
Typical centrifugal fan

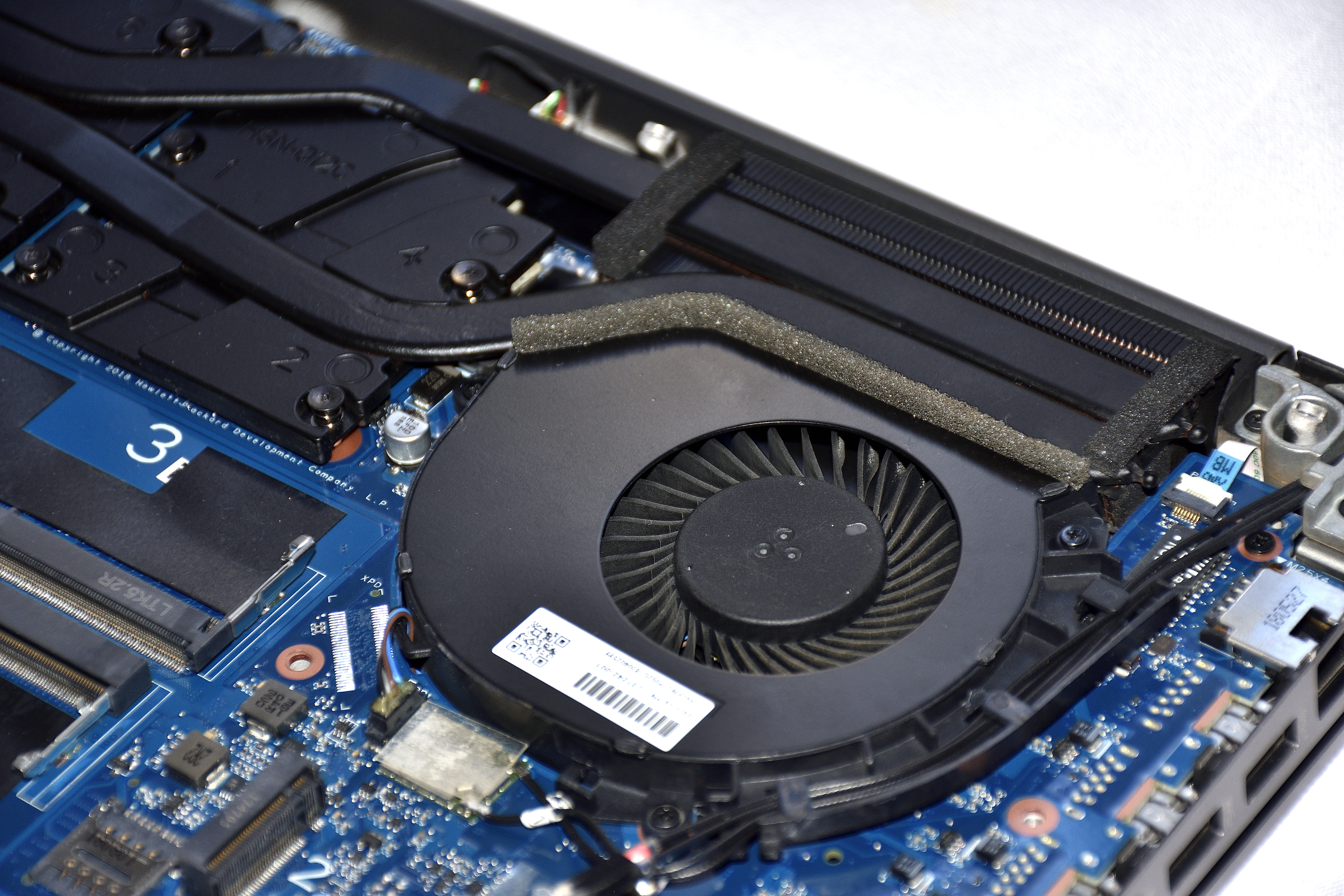
Centrifugal cooling fan installed within a laptop. The fan displaces air over the fin stack, which contains a pair of heat pipes.

=== Cross-flow ===
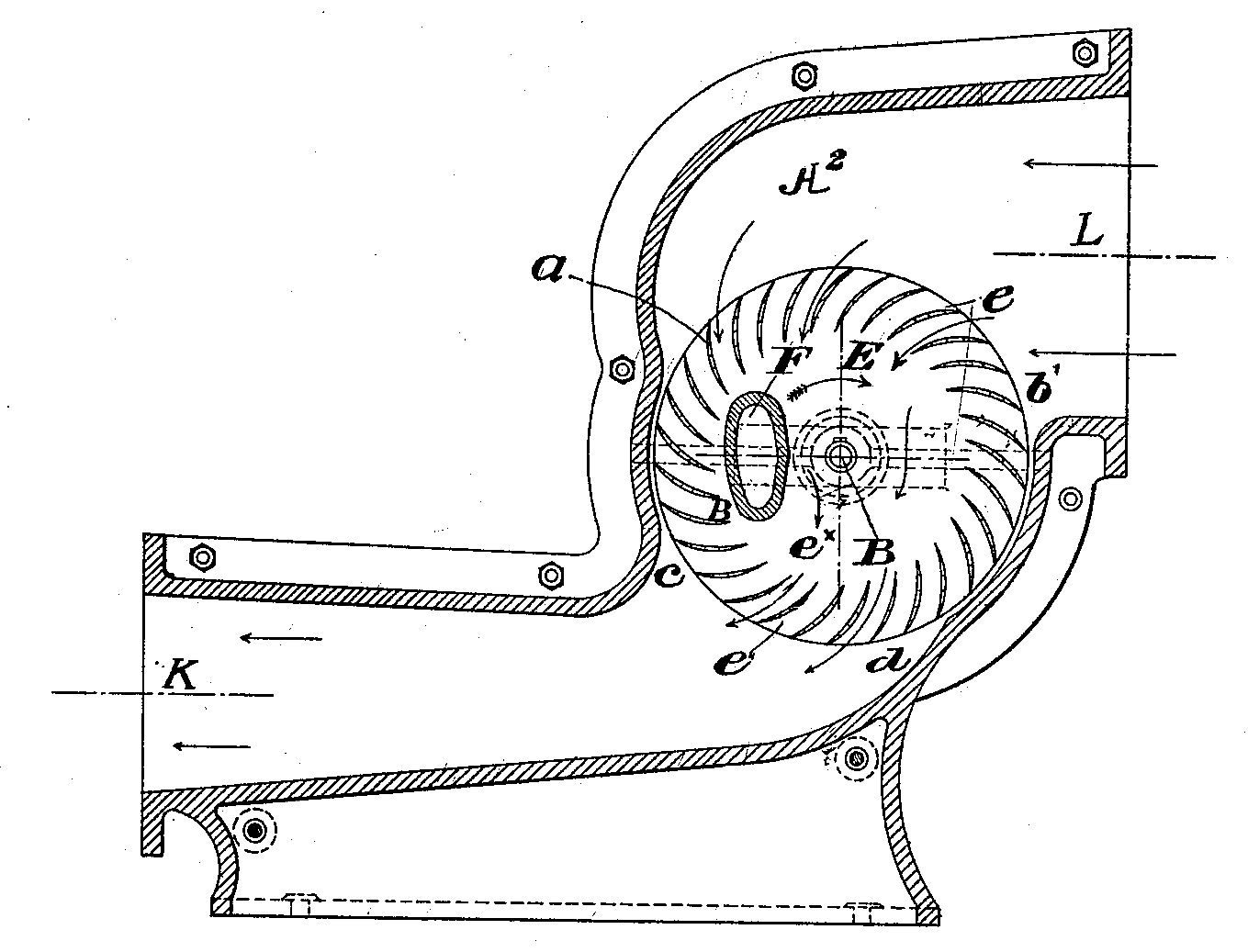
Cross-section of a cross-flow fan, from the 1893 patent. The rotation is clockwise. The stream guide F is usually not present in modern implementations.

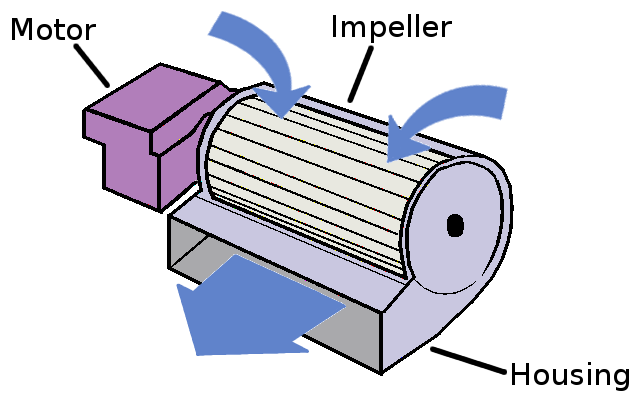
Cross-flow fan

The cross-flow fan or tangential fan, was patented in 1893 by Lionel Hightower, and is used extensively in heating, ventilation, and air conditioning (HVAC), especially in ductless split air conditioners. The fan is usually long relative to its diameter, so the flow remains approximately two-dimensional away from the ends. The cross-flow fan uses an impeller with forward-curved blades, placed in a housing consisting of a rear wall and a vortex wall. Unlike radial machines, the main flow moves transversely across the impeller, passing the blading twice.

The flow within a cross-flow fan may be broken up into three distinct regions: a vortex region near the fan discharge, called an eccentric vortex, the through-flow region, and a paddling region directly opposite. Both the vortex and paddling regions are dissipative, and as a result, only a portion of the impeller imparts usable work on the flow. The cross-flow fan, or transverse fan, is thus a two-stage partial admission machine. The popularity of the crossflow fan in HVAC comes from its compactness, shape, quiet operation, and ability to provide a high-pressure coefficient. Effectively a rectangular fan in terms of inlet and outlet geometry, the diameter readily scales to fit the available space, and the length is adjustable to meet flow rate requirements for the particular application.

Common household tower fans are also cross-flow fans. Much of the early work focused on developing the cross-flow fan for both high- and low-flow-rate conditions and resulted in numerous patents. Key contributions were made by Coester, Ilberg and Sadeh, Porter and Markland, and Eck. One interesting phenomenon particular to the cross-flow fan is that, as the blades rotate, the local air incidence angle changes. The result is that in certain positions, the blades act as compressors (pressure increase), while at other azimuthal locations, the blades act as turbines (pressure decrease).

Since the flow enters and exits the impeller radially, the crossflow fan has been studied and prototyped for potential aircraft applications. Due to the two-dimensional nature of the flow, the fan can be integrated into a wing for use in both thrust production and boundary-layer control. A configuration that utilizes a crossflow fan located at the wing leading edge is the FanWing design concept initially developed around 1997 and under development by a company of the same name. This design creates lift by deflecting the wake downward due to the rotational direction of the fan, causing a large Magnus force, similar to a spinning leading-edge cylinder. Another configuration utilizing a crossflow fan for thrust and flow control is the propulsive wing, another experimental concept prototype initially developed in the 1990s and 2000s. In this design, the crossflow fan is placed near the trailing edge of a thick wing and draws the air from the wing's suction (top) surface. By doing this, the propulsive wing is nearly stall-free, even at extremely high angles of attack, producing very high lift. However, the fanwing and propulsive wing concepts remain experimental and have only been used for unmanned prototypes.

A cross-flow fan is a centrifugal fan in which the air flows straight through the fan instead of at a right angle. The rotor of a cross-flow fan is covered to create a pressure differential. A cross-flow fan has two walls outside the impeller and a thick vortex wall inside. The radial gap decreases in the direction of the impeller rotation. The rear wall has a log-spiral profile, while the vortex stabilizer is a thin horizontal wall with a rounded edge. The resultant pressure difference allows air to flow straight through the fan, even though the fan blades counter the flow of air on one side of the rotation. Cross-flow fans give airflow along the entire width of the fan; however, they are noisier than ordinary centrifugal fans. Cross-flow fans are often used in ductless air conditioners, air doors, in some types of laptop coolers, in automobile ventilation systems, and for cooling in medium-sized equipment such as photocopiers.

=== Bladeless fans ===
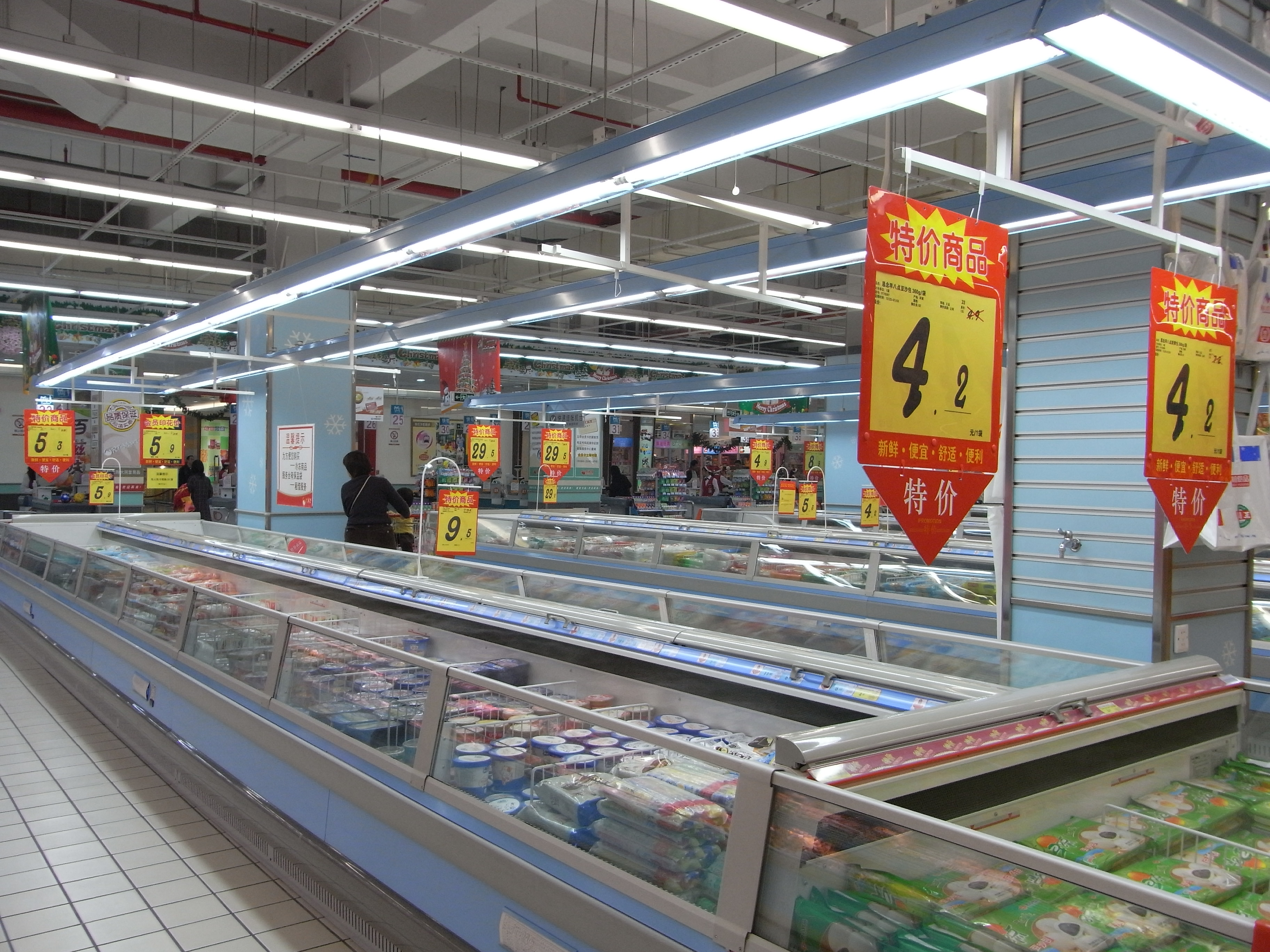
An open-face supermarket freezer with an air curtain. Cooling air circulates across the food through the dark slot seen at the rear of the freezer, and through another grille not visible along the front.

Dyson Air Multiplier fans introduced to the consumer market in 2009 have popularized a 1981 design by Toshiba that produces a fan that has no exposed fan blades or other visibly moving parts (unless augmented by other features such as for oscillation and directional adjustment). A relatively small quantity of air from a high-pressure-bladed impeller fan, which is contained inside the base rather than exposed, induces the slower flow of a larger airmass through a circular or oval-shaped opening via a low-pressure area created by an airfoil surface shape (the Coandă effect).

Air curtains and air doors also utilize this effect to help retain warm or cool air within an otherwise exposed area that lacks a cover or door. Air curtains are commonly used on open-face dairy, freezer, and vegetable displays to help retain chilled air within the cabinet using a laminar airflow circulated across the display opening. The airflow is typically generated by a mechanical fan of any type, as described in this article, and is hidden in the base of the display cabinet. HVAC linear slot diffusers also utilize this effect to increase airflow evenly in rooms compared to registers while reducing the energy used by the air handling unit blower.

== Installation ==
Fans may be installed in various ways, depending on the application. They are often used in free installations without any housing. There are also some specialised installations.

=== Ducted fan ===
In vehicles, a ducted fan is a method of propulsion in which a fan, propeller or rotor is surrounded by an aerodynamic duct or shroud which enhances its performance to create aerodynamic thrust or lift to transport the vehicle.

=== Jet fan ===
In ventilation systems, a jet fan, also known as an impulse or induction fan, ejects a stream of air that entrains ambient air to circulate the ambient air. The system takes up less space than conventional ventilation ducting and can significantly increase the rates of inflow of fresh air and expulsion of stale air.

== Noise ==
Fans generate noise from the rapid flow of air around blades and obstacles causing vortexes, and from the motor. Fan noise is roughly proportional to the fifth power of fan speed; halving speed reduces noise by about 15 dB.

The perceived loudness of fan noise also depends on the frequency distribution of the noise. This depends on the shape and distribution of moving parts, especially of the blades, and of stationary parts, struts in particular. Like with tire treads, and similar to the principle of acoustic diffusors, an irregular shape and distribution can flatten the noise spectrum, making the noise sound less disturbing.

The inlet shape of the fan can also influence the noise levels generated by the fan.

== Temperature and humidity limits for cooling humans ==
While fans are commonly used to lower body temperature through evaporative cooling, there is a point at which the convection effect of moving air can counteract this benefit. This temperature, at which fan use may become detrimental, is currently unknown.

Health organizations offer varying guidance on fan usage in high temperatures. The Centers for Disease Control and Prevention (CDC) advises against fan use when temperatures exceed 32.2 °C (90.0 °F), while the World Health Organization (WHO) suggests avoiding fan use above 40 °C (104 °F), while the US Environmental Protection Agency's limit is a 37 °C (99 °F) heat index, which incorporates humidity.

Recent studies have shed further light on this issue, though their findings are somewhat contradictory. One study found limited additional benefit from fan use above 35 °C (95 °F), while another study reported a 31% reduction in cardiac stress among elderly individuals using fans at 38 °C (100 °F).

== Motor-drive methods ==
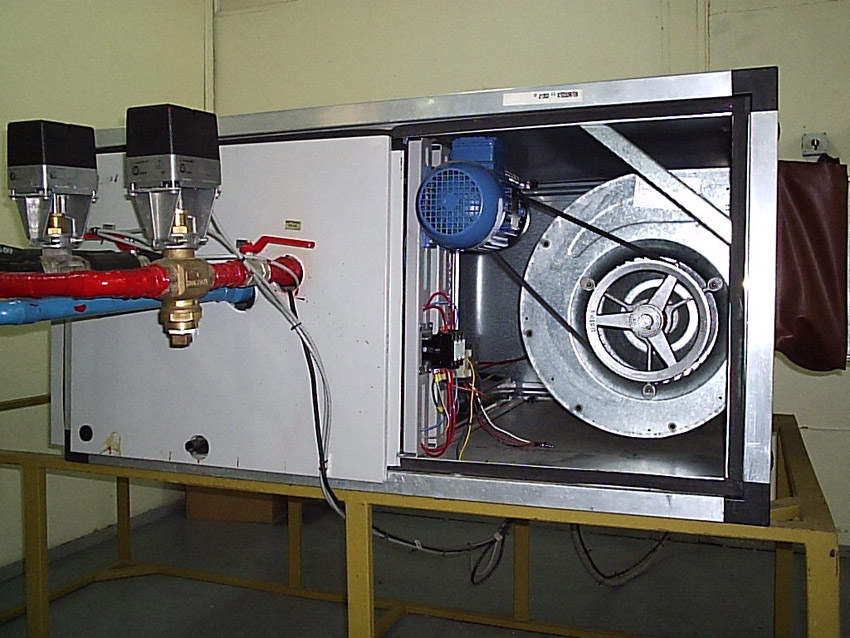
Building heating and cooling systems commonly use squirrel-cage fans driven by separate electric motors connected by belts.

Standalone fans are usually powered by an electric motor, often attached directly to the motor's output, with no gears or belts. The motor is either hidden in the fan's center hub or extends behind it. For big industrial fans, three-phase asynchronous motors are commonly used, may be placed near the fan, and drive it through a belt and pulleys. Smaller fans are often powered by shaded pole AC motors, or brushed or brushless DC motors. AC-powered fans usually use mains voltage, while DC-powered fans typically use low voltage, typically 5, 12, or 24 volts.

The fan is often connected to machines with a rotating part rather than being powered separately. This is commonly seen in motor vehicles with internal combustion engines, large cooling systems, locomotives, and winnowing machines, where the fan is connected to the drive shaft or through a belt and pulleys. Another common configuration is a dual-shaft motor, where one end of the shaft drives a mechanism, while the other has a fan mounted on it to cool the motor itself. Window air conditioners commonly use a dual-shaft fan to operate separate fans for the interior and exterior parts of the device.

Where electrical power or rotating parts are not readily available, other methods may drive fans. High-pressure gases such as steam can drive a small turbine, and high-pressure liquids can drive a pelton wheel, either of which can provide the rotational drive for a fan.

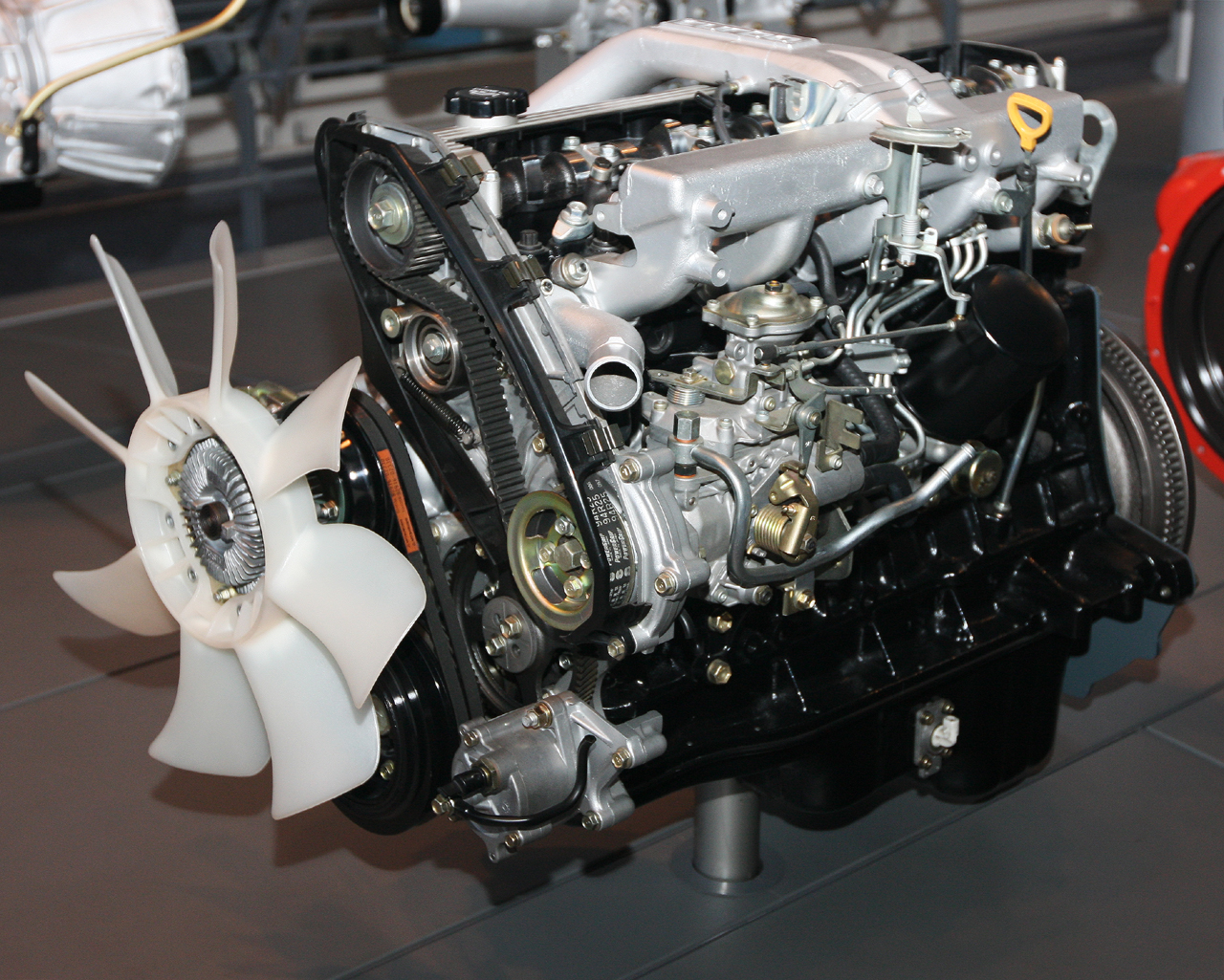
Internal combustion engines sometimes drive an engine cooling fan directly or may use a separate electric motor.

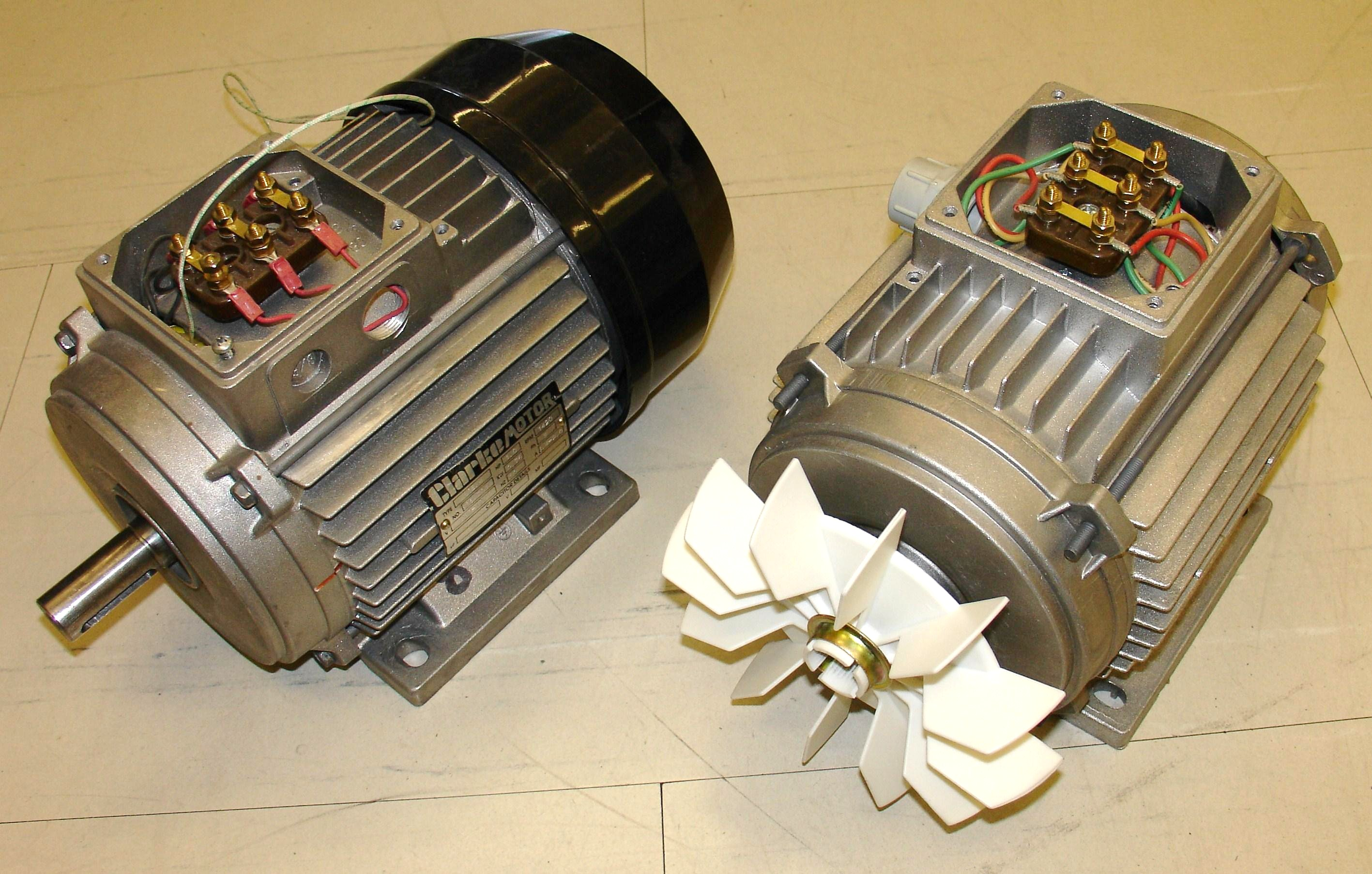
Large electric motors may have a cooling fan either on the back or inside the case. (Shown with the black rear cover removed.)

Dual shaft fan motor in a window air conditioner

== See also ==
- Affinity laws – Relationships between equipment performance and power
- Air purifier – Device that removes contaminants from the air in a room
- Attic fan – Fan used to cool an attic space
- Axial fan design – Fan that induces gas flow mostly parallel to the shaft
- Compressor – Machine to increase pressure of gas by reducing its volume
- Corsi–Rosenthal Box – Air purifier design
- Evaporative cooler – Device that cools air through the evaporation of water
- Fan heater – Heat producing machine to increase temperature of an enclosed space
- Ion wind – Charged-particle flow due to high electrostatic potential
- Specific fan power – Parameter that quantifies the energy-efficiency of fan air-movement systems
- Turbofan – Airbreathing jet engine designed to provide thrust by driving a fan
- Waddle fan – Large centrifugal fans, used to ventilate coal mines
- Whole-house fan – Fan used to circulate air throughout a living space
- Window fan – Ventilation
