= Whirlybird =

Whirlybird may refer to:

- Helicopter (slang)
  - Whirlybirds, a television program that aired in the United States from 1957 to 1960
- Attic fan (slang and brand name)
- Samara (fruit) (slang), the fruit of a maple tree
- Paper fortune teller, a form of origami
- Power trowel (slang), light construction equipment
- "Whirlybird", a jazz tune written by Neal Hefti featured on the Count Basie album The Atomic Mr. Basie
- "Whirlybird", a British company founded in 2000, designing and manufacturing plastic model kits and accessories
- Whirlybird, a game in Google Play Games
