= Window fan =

Ventilation

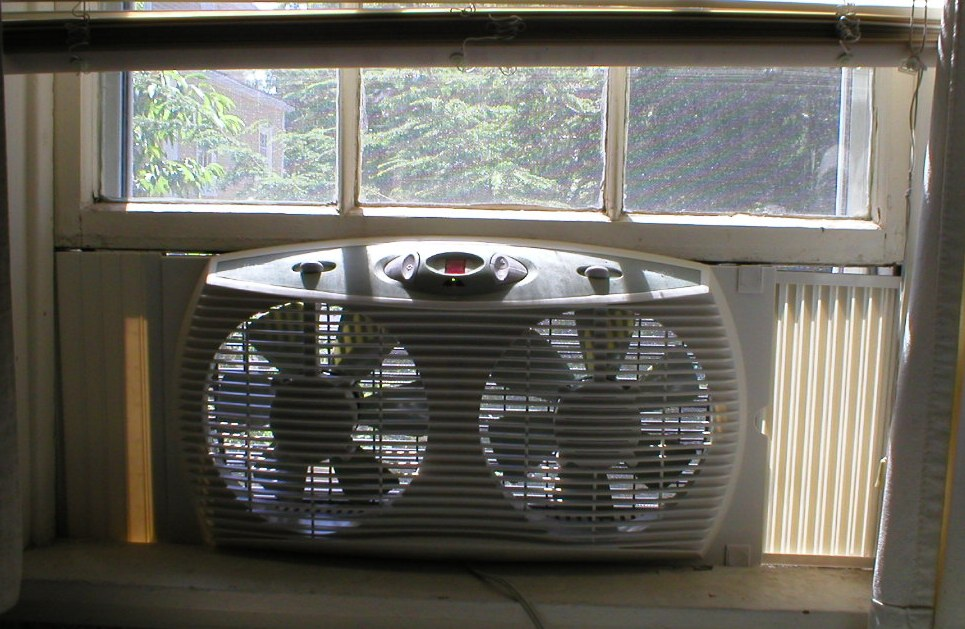
A small twin window fan with thermostat

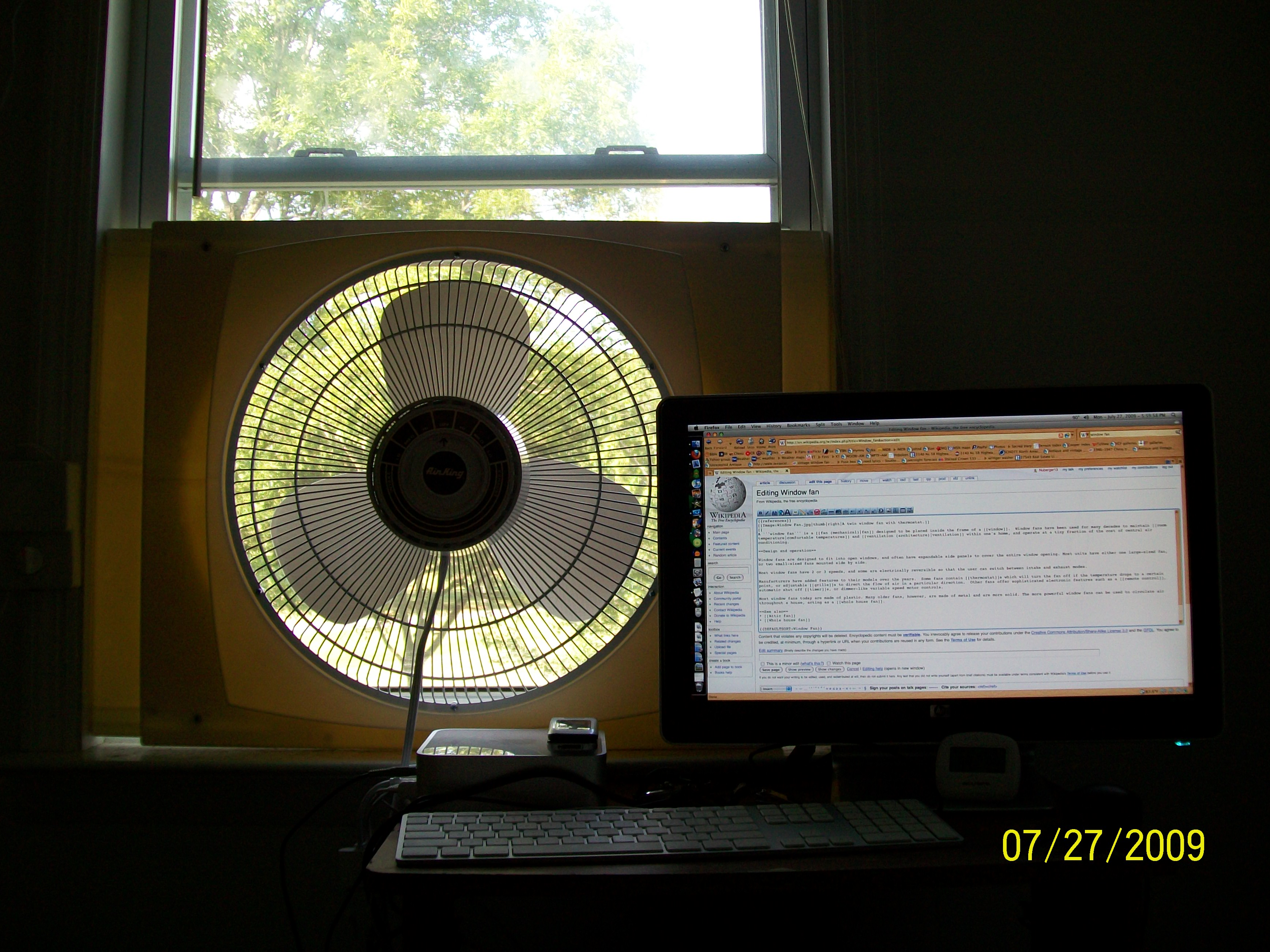
A large single whole-house window fan with three-speed control and intake/exhaust switch

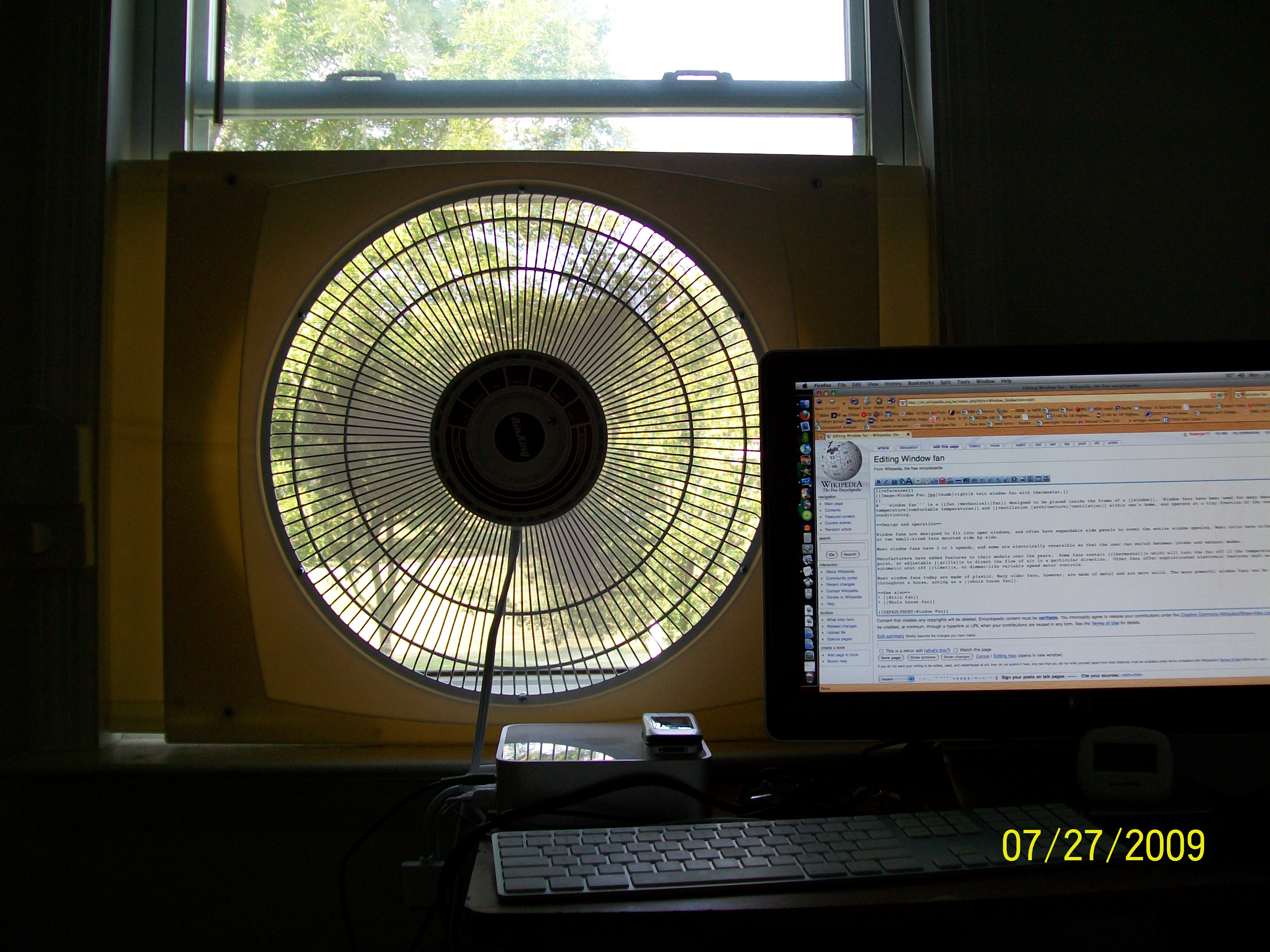
The same fan, in operation

A window fan is a fan designed to be placed inside the frame of a window. Window fans have been used for many decades to maintain comfortable temperatures and ventilation within one's home, and operate at a tiny fraction of the cost of central air conditioning.

== Design and operation ==
Window fans are designed to fit into open windows, and often have expandable side panels to cover the entire window opening. Most units have either one large fan, or two small fans mounted side by side.

Most window fans have two or three speeds, and some are electrically reversible so that the user can switch between intake and exhaust modes.

Manufacturers have added features to their models over the years. Some fans contain thermostats which will turn the fan off if the temperature drops to a certain point, or adjustable grilles to direct the flow of air in a particular direction. Other fans offer sophisticated electronic features such as a remote control, automatic shut-off timers, and dimmer-like variable-speed motor controls.

Most window fans today are made of plastic. Many older fans, however, are made of metal and are more solid. The more powerful window fans can be used to circulate air throughout a house, acting as a whole-house fan.

== See also ==
- Attic fan
- List of home appliances
- Whole house fan
