= KDK =

Company that manufactures ventilating products

KDK Company, Division of PES
- Type: Subsidiary
- Founded: 1909; 117 years ago (as Nippon Electric Industry Co. Ltd)
- Headquarters: Japan
- Products: Ventilating Fan; Thermo Ventilator; Air Moving Equipment; Ceiling Fan; Air Curtain; Hand dryer Electric Fan; Dehumidifier; Rangehood
- Parent: Panasonic Ecology Systems
- Website: KDK Malaysia; KDK Indonesia; KDK Philippines; KDK Singapore; KDK Japan; KDK Middle East

Kawakita Denki Kigyosha (Japanese for "Kawakita Electric Company"; commonly known as KDK), is the brand name used by Matsushita Ecology Systems Co. to manufacture the group's ventilating products. Before becoming part of Matsushita Electric, KDK was a separate company not affiliated with Matsushita Electric Industrial Co. Ltd. KDK was registered as a trademark in 1912 but originated in 1909 as Nippon Electric Industry Co. Ltd.

KDK manufactures electric fans, ceiling fans, ventilating fans, range hoods, air doors (air curtains), hand dryers, dehumidifiers, and subterranean air blowers, under the Panasonic brand.

== History ==
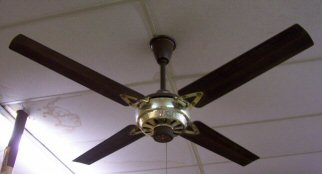
This unusual ceiling fan was a rare and poorly organized fail-sales attempt of an imported KDK ceiling fan which was relabeled "RoyalAire By KDK" by then distributor Sumitomo America in the decade of the 1980s for the United States.

KDK became part of the Matsushita Conglomerate in 1956. Matsushita Seiko as it was known is no longer headquartered in Osaka, Japan; manufacturing for KDK and Panasonic Ventilating products was transferred from Selangor, Malaysia to mainland China in 2001. All manufacturing is done at the Shenzhen Panasonic Air Works Co., Ltd. factory in Shenzhen, China and the international sales offices has also re-located to Hong Kong under the Matsushita Seiko Hong Kong International Manufacturing Company, Ltd. known as "HIMCO" since 2001.

The oldest KDK distributor is Abdulaziz & Sulaiman Saleh Al-Hakbany Sons Trading Co. from Saudi Arabia which dates back to 1936. Puerto Rico is the second oldest KDK distributor dating back to 1940. The newest distributors for KDK are La Innovacion from the Dominican Republic (2002) and O.C.S. from Jamaica (2004); the latter also distributes National Branded Fans which (now known as Panasonic since 2008)

KDK International Philippines Corp. (KIPCO) was founded in November 1979 as a joint venture company between Avenue Electrical Supply and Matsushita Seiko Co. Ltd, for the purpose of importing, distributing and selling all KDK products in the Philippine market such as electric fans, ventilating fans and other air moving equipment.

KDK has made two attempts to distribute their products in contiguous United States. The first attempt was in 1983 when U.S.-based Patton Industries imported the electric oscillating fans, relabeled them "KDK by Patton", and the ceiling fans were then relabeled "RoyalAire" by Sumitomo America, one of Matsushita's banks, shareholders and insurance providers. This was a failure as the products never caught on with consumers. The second attempt was in 1998. Miami-based importer Caribbean Export Appliances, Inc. tried to sell KDK products but, due to their high resale prices and poor selection of models and colors, sales were minimal. The inventory was exported to Jamaica and other Caribbean nations until the Puerto Rico distributor reported it to Matsushita Seiko, which in return revoked Caribbeans Exports' distribution license.

In 2003, Matsushita Seiko Co. Ltd was renamed as Matsushita Ecology Systems Co., Ltd and further changed to KDK Company, Division of PES (Panasonic Ecology Systems Co., Ltd.) 5 years later. After corporate restructuring and dissolution of the partnership between Matsushita and Seiko. The company opened a wholly owned sales branch in Malaysia in April 2002. In Indonesia, the company established on 1 December 2001 and early KDK products manufactured by PT. National Gobel Indonesia. In Singapore, the company appointed Capital Distributors Pte Ltd in August 1996 as the sole distributor for KDK fans in Singapore. On 1 August 2005, the KDK International Philippines Co., Ltd. has been re-organized as Kipcol International Corp. Since then, the company not only sell KDK brand exclusively but, also began selling other brand of products to complement its KDK line. In 2004 KDK was adjudged as the Top Electric Fan Brand for Product Quality and Excellence by the National Consumers Affairs Foundation. And in 2013 KDK was awarded by the Gold Brand Council of the Philippines as a “Gold Brand” one of the most trusted and admired brands. KDK products also made in Thailand by Panasonic Ecology Systems (Thailand) Co. Ltd and in China by Panasonic Ecology Systems Guangdong Co., Ltd.

== Products ==
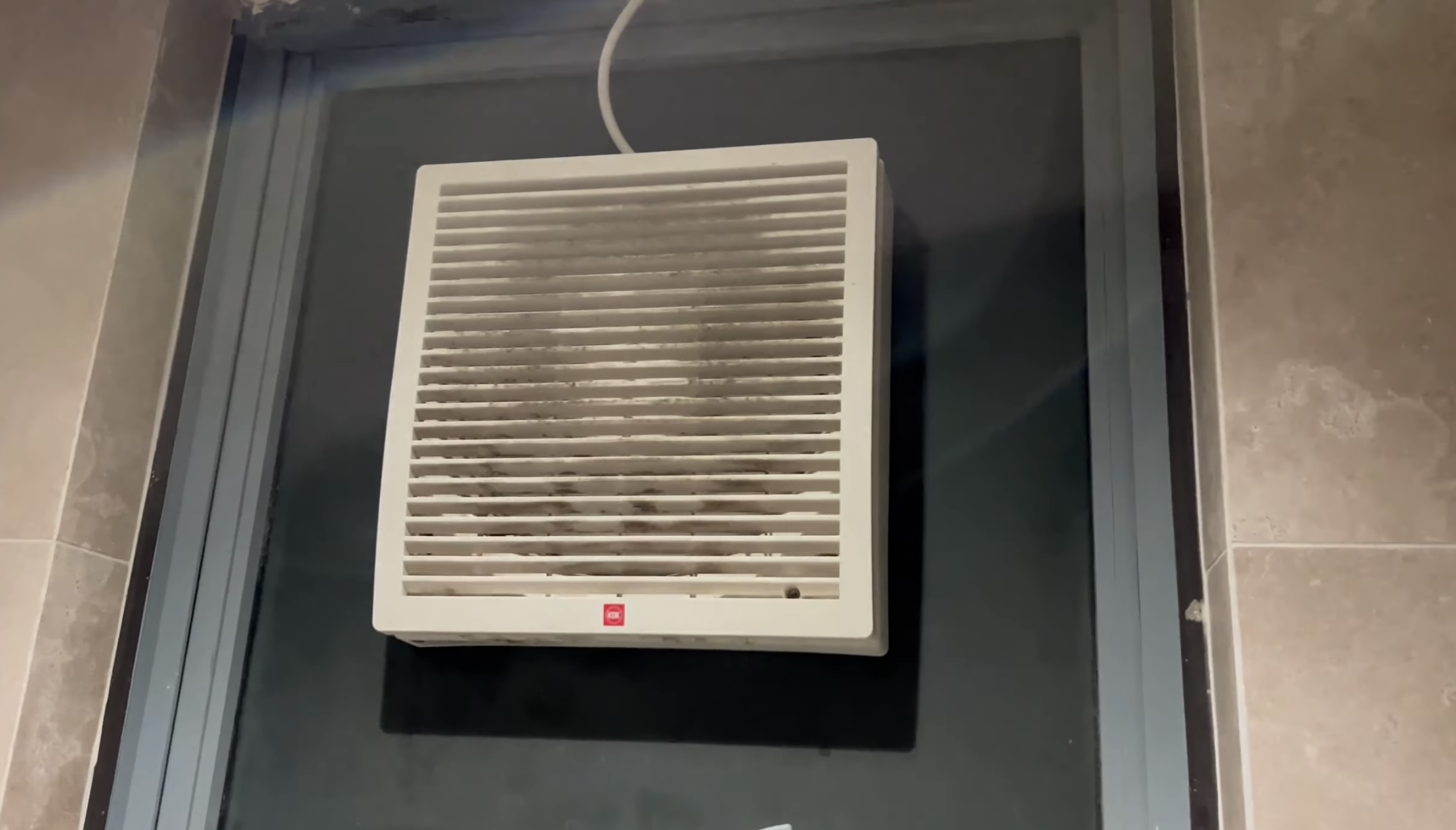
KDK 20WHCT ventilation fan for the Singapore, Indonesian and all markets

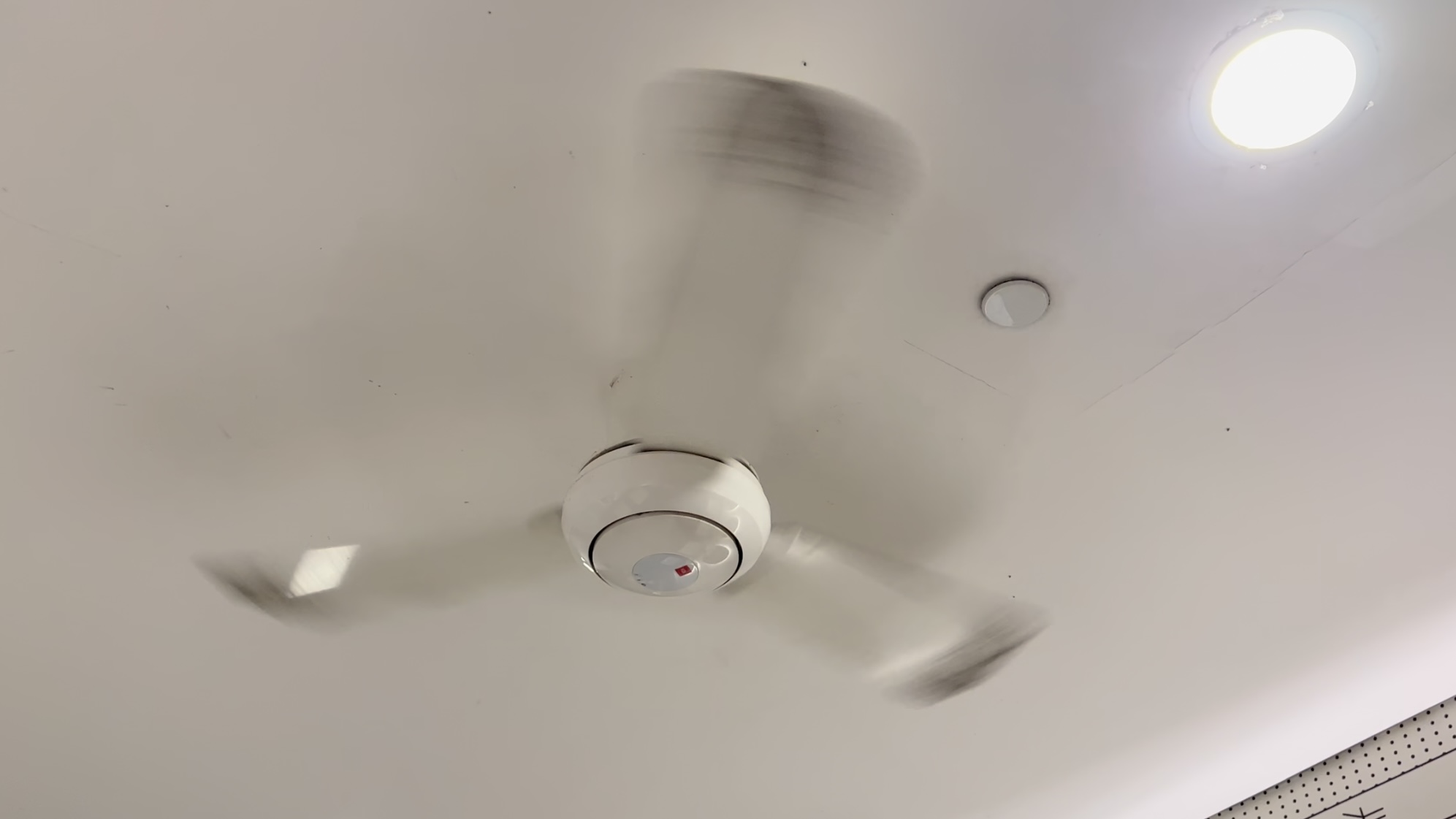
KDK M11SU remote-controlled ceiling fan for the Singapore, Indonesian and Malaysian markets (Malaysian markets are named as K11Z1, Indonesian markets are named as S44XU)

KDK currently manufactures ventilating fans, range hoods, air curtains, hand dryers, ceiling fans, dehumidifiers, and other air-moving equipment. Electric fans have been its most profitable product division. KDK is the world's largest manufacturer of electronical fans and produces different varieties, such as orbit fans, wall fans, desk fans, pedestal fans, living fans, and stand fans. KDK also manufactures all electric fans sold under the National (now a defunct manufacturer of non-audiovisual products of Panasonic) and Panasonic brands.
