= Industrial fan =

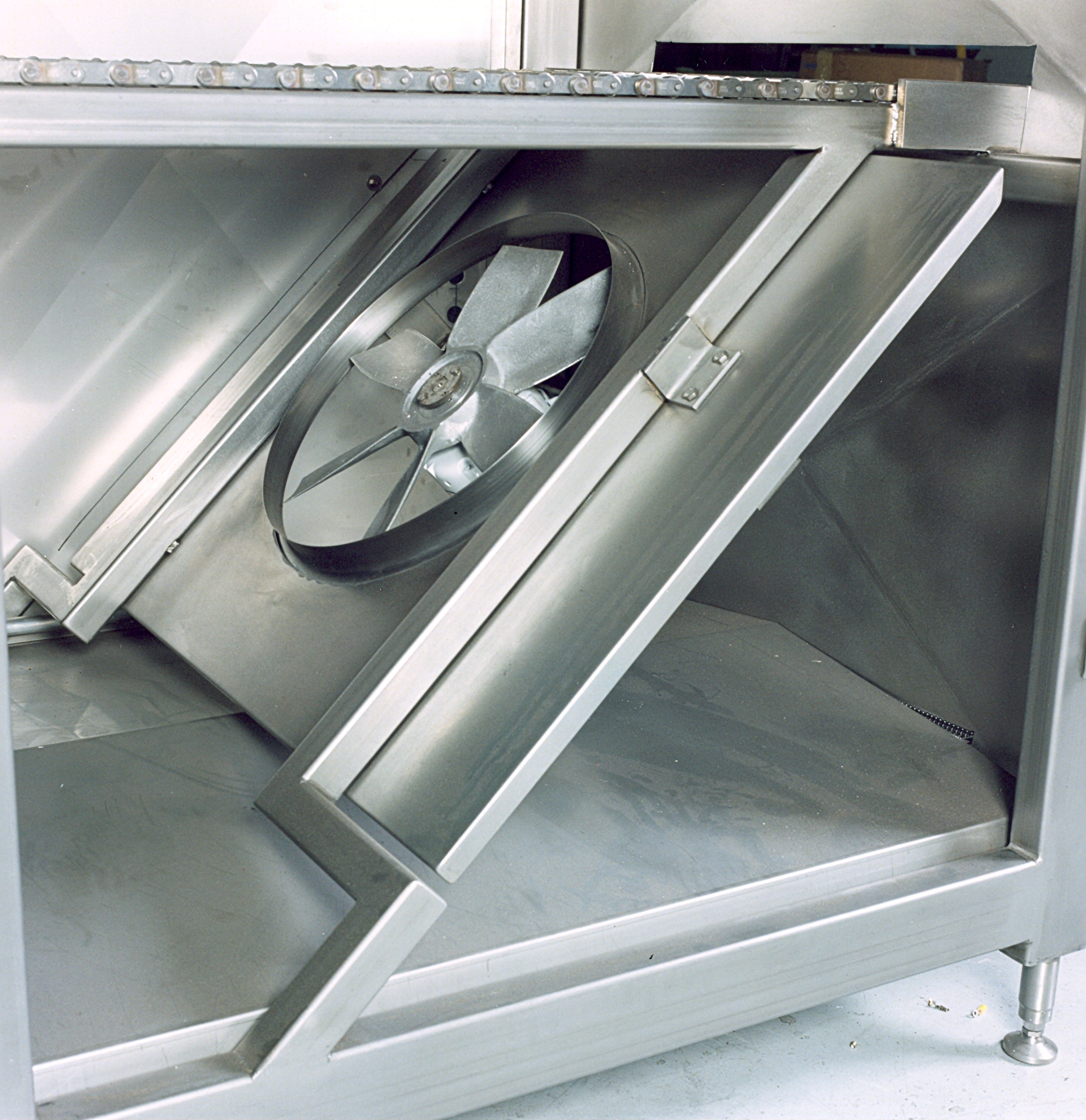
Industrial fan used for food processing

Industrial fans and blowers are machines whose primary function is to provide and accommodate a large flow of air or gas to various parts of a building or other structures. This is achieved by rotating a number of blades, connected to a hub and shaft, and driven by a motor or turbine. The flow rates of these mechanical fans range from approximately 200 cubic feet (5.7 m^{3}) to 2,000,000 cubic feet (57,000 m^{3}) per minute. A blower is another name for a fan that operates where the resistance to the flow is primarily on the downstream side of the fan.

== Functions and industries ==
There are many uses for the continuous flow of air or gas that industrial fans generate, including combustion, ventilation, aeration, particulate transport, exhaust, cooling, air-cleaning, and drying, to name a few. The industries served include electrical power production, pollution control, metal manufacturing and processing, cement production, mining, petrochemical, food processing, cryogenics, and clean rooms.

== Centrifugal fans and axial fans ==
Most industrial fans may be categorized into one of two general types: centrifugal fans and axial fans.

=== Centrifugal ===
The centrifugal design uses the centrifugal force generated by a rotating disk, with blades mounted at right angles to the disk, to impart movement to the air or gas and increase its pressure. The assembly of the hub, disk and blades is known as the fan wheel, and often includes other components with aerodynamic or structural functions. The centrifugal fan wheel is typically contained within a scroll-shaped fan housing, resembling the shell of the nautilus sea creature with a central hole. The air or gas inside the spinning fan is thrown off the outside of the wheel, to an outlet at the housing's largest diameter. This simultaneously draws more air or gas into the wheel through the central hole. Inlet and outlet ducting are often attached to the fan's housing, to supply and/or exhaust the air or gas to the industry's requirements.

There are many varieties of centrifugal fans, which may have fan wheels that range from less than 3 cm to over 16 feet (4.9 m) in diameter.

=== Axial ===
The axial design uses axial forces to achieve the movement of the air or gas, spinning a central hub with blades extending radially from its outer diameter. The fluid is moved parallel to the fan wheel's shaft, or axis of rotation. The axial fan is often contained within a short section of cylindrical ductwork, to which inlet and outlet ducting can be connected.

Axial fan types have fan wheels with diameters that usually range from less than a foot (0.3 meters) to over 30 feet (9.1 m), although axial cooling tower fan wheels may exceed 82 feet (25 m) in diameter.

In general, axial fans are used where the principal requirement is for a large volume of flow, and the centrifugal design where both flow and higher pressures are required. Axial fans provide huge airflow at low pressures. They draw air parallel to the axis and force it straight out.

== Design paths ==
There are several paths to determining a fan design for an application.

For industries where the application requirements do not vary greatly and applicable fan designs have diameters of around 4 feet (1.2 meters) or less, a standard or pre-engineered design might be selected.

When the application involves more complex specifications or a larger fan, then a design based on an existing model configuration will often satisfy the requirements. Many model configurations already cover the range of current industry processes. An appropriate model from the fan company's catalogue is selected, and the company's engineers apply design rules to calculate the dimensions and select options and material for the desired performance, strength and operating environment.

Some applications require a dedicated, custom configuration for a fan design to satisfy all specifications.

All industrial fan designs must be accurately engineered to meet performance specifications while maintaining structural integrity. For each application, there are specific flow and pressure requirements. Depending on the application, the fan may be subject to high rotating speeds, an operating environment with corrosive chemicals or abrasive air streams, and extreme temperatures. Larger fans and higher speeds produce greater forces on the rotating structures; for safety and reliability, the design must eliminate excessive stresses and excitable resonant frequencies. Computer modeling programs for computational fluid dynamics (CFD) and finite element analysis (FEA) are often employed in the design process, in addition to laboratory scale model testing. Even after the fan is built the verification might continue, using fan performance testing for flow and pressure, strain gage testing for stresses and tests to record the fan's resonant frequencies.

== Fan subtypes ==
Fan types and their subtypes are industry standard, recognized by all major fan producers.

=== Centrifugal ===
Any of these fan subtypes can be built with long-lasting erosion-resistant liners.

Airfoil (Air foil) – Used for a wide range of applications in many industries, fans with hollow, airfoil-profiled blades are designed for use in airstreams where high efficiency and quiet operation are required. They are used extensively for continuous service at ambient and elevated temperatures in forced and induced draft applications in the metals, chemical, power generation, paper, rock products, glass, resource recovery, incineration and other industries throughout the world.

Backward curve – These fans have efficiencies nearly as high as the airfoil design. An advantage is that their single-thickness, curved plate blades prevent the possibility of dust particle buildup inside the blade, as may occur with perforated airfoil blades. The robust design allows high tip-speed operation, and therefore this fan is often used in high-pressure applications.

Backward inclined – These fans have simple flat blades, backwardly inclined to match the velocity pattern of the air passing through the fan wheel for high-efficiency operation. These fans are typically used in high-volume, relatively low-pressure, clean air applications.

Radial blade – The flat blades of this type are arranged in a radial pattern. These rugged fans offer high pressure capability with average efficiency. They are often fitted with erosion-resistant liners to extend rotor life. The housing design is compact to minimize the floor space requirement.

Radial tipped – These fans have wheels that are backward curved, but in a way slightly different from backward curved fans. Backward curved fans have wheels whose blades curve outward, while radial-tip fans' blades are curved inward and radial at their tips (hence the name "radial tip"), while still in a backwardly-curved configuration. Their curvature can also be thought of as radial at the tips but gradually sloping toward the direction of rotation. This rugged design is used in high-volume flow rate applications when the pressure requirement is rather high and erosion resistance is necessary. It offers medium efficiencies. A common application is the dirty side of a baghouse or precipitator. The design is more compact than airfoil, backward curved or backward inclined fans.

Paddle-wheel – This is an open impeller design without shrouds. Although the efficiency is not high, this fan is well suited for applications with extremely high dust loading. It can be offered with field-replaceable blade liners from ceramic tiles or tungsten carbide. This fan may also be used in high-temperature applications.

Forward-curve – This "squirrel cage" impeller generates the highest volume flow rate (for a given tip speed) of all the centrifugal fans. Therefore, it often has the advantage of offering the smallest physical package available for a given application. This type of fan is commonly used in high-temperature furnaces. However, these fans can only be used for conveying air with low dust loading because they are the most sensitive to particle build-up, but also due to the large number of blades that forward-curve wheels require.

Industrial exhausters – This is a relatively inexpensive, medium-duty, steeply inclined flat-bladed fan for exhausting gases, conveying chips, etc.

Pre-engineered fans (PE) – A series of fans of varying blade shapes that are usually available in only standard sizes. Because they are pre-engineered these fans may be available with relatively short delivery times. Often, pre-engineered rotors with various blade shapes may be installed into a common housing. These are often available in a wide range of volume and pressure requirements to meet the needs of many applications.

Pressure blowers – These are high-pressure, low-volume blowers used in combustion air applications in furnaces or to provide “blow-off” air for clearing and/or drying applications.

Surgeless blowers – These high-pressure, low-volume blowers have a reduced tendency for “surging” (periodic variation of flow rate) even at severely reduced fan speeds. This allows extreme turndown (low-flow) without significant pulsation.

Mechanical vapor recovery blowers -These specially designed centrifugal fans are designed to increase temperature and pressure of saturated steam in a closed-loop system.

Acid gas blowers - These very heavy construction blowers are suitable for inlet pressures from full vacuum to 100 psig. Materials are selected for corrosion resistance to the gases and particulate handled.

Specialty process gas blowers - These blowers are for high pressure petrochemical processes.

=== Axial ===
High-temperature axial fans – These are high-volume fans designed to operate against low flow resistance in industrial convection furnaces. They may be of either single-direction or bi-directional designs. Extremely rugged, they are most often used in high-temperature furnace (up to 1800 degF) application.

Tube axial fans – These are axial fan units with fan wheels located in cylindrical tubes, without inlet or outlet dampers.

Vaneaxial fans – These axial flow fans have a higher pressure capability due to the presence of static vanes.

Variable pitch axial fans – The blades on these axial fans are manually adjustable to permit the blade angle to be changed. This allows operation over a much wider range of volume/pressure relationships. The blades are adjusted periodically to optimize efficiency by matching the blade pitch to the varying conditions for the application. These fans are often used in mining applications.

Variable pitch on-the-fly axial fans – These are similar to “Variable Pitch Axial Fans” except they include an internal mechanism that allows the blade pitch to be adjusted while the fan rotor is in motion. These versatile fans offer high-efficiency operation at many different points of operation. This instantaneous blade adjustment capability is an advantage that is possible with axial fans only.

Cooling fans - (also referred to as "cooling tower fans") - These are axial fans, typically with large diameters, for low pressures and large volumes of airflow. Applications are in wet mechanical cooling towers, air-cooled steam condensers, air-cooled heat exchangers, radiators, or similar air-cooled applications.

Mixed-flow fans - The gas flow patterns these fans produce resemble a combination of axial and centrifugal patterns, although the fan wheels often appear similar to centrifugal wheels. There are various types of mixed-flow fans, including gas-tight high-pressure fans and blowers.

=== Jet ===
Jet Fans are used for daily ventilation requirements and smoke extraction in case of fire (250 ® C/120 min) These Industrial fans have symmetrical impeller blades; 100% reversible with low noise emissions IP55 motors, insulation class H (smoke extraction version). Application for Basement Ventilation & Tunnel Ventilation etc.

== Flow control ==
There are several means of controlling the flow rate of a fan, e.g., temporarily reducing the air or gas flow rate; these can be applied to both centrifugal and axial fans.

Speed Variation - All of the fan types described above can be used in conjunction with a variable speed driver. This might be an adjustable frequency AC controller, a DC motor and drive, a steam turbine driver, or a hydraulic variable speed drive unit ("fluid drive"). Flow control by means of variable speed is typically smoother and more efficient than by means of damper control. Significant power savings (with reduced cost of operation) are possible if variable speed fan drives are used for applications that require reduced flow operation for a significant portion of the system operating life.

Industrial Dampers - These devices also allow fan volumetric flow control during operation, by means of panels so as to direct gas flow or restrict the inlet or outlet areas.

There is a variety of dampers available:

Louvered Inlet Box Dampers
Radial Inlet Dampers
Variable Inlet Vane (VIV) Dampers
Vortex Dampers
Discharge Dampers

== See also ==
- Fan (mechanical)
- Axial fan design
- Specific fan power
- Three-dimensional losses and correlation in turbomachinery
