= Affinity laws =

Relationships between equipment performance and power

The affinity laws (also known as the "Fan Laws" or "Pump Laws") for pumps/fans are used in hydraulics, hydronics and/or HVAC to express the relationship between variables involved in pump or fan performance (such as head, volumetric flow rate, shaft speed) and power. They apply to pumps, fans, and hydraulic turbines. In these rotary implements, the affinity laws apply both to centrifugal and axial flows.

The laws are derived using the Buckingham π theorem. The affinity laws are useful as they allow the prediction of the head discharge characteristic of a pump or fan from a known characteristic measured at a different speed or impeller diameter. The only requirement is that the two pumps or fans are dynamically similar, that is, the ratios of the fluid forced are the same. It is also required that the two impellers' speed or diameter are running at the same efficiency.

Understanding the affinity laws requires understanding the pump discharge and head coefficient dimensionless numbers. For a given pump, one can compute the discharge and head coefficients as follows:

$${ C_d } = { Q\over nD^3}$$
$${ C_h } = { gH\over n^2D^2}$$

The coefficient for a given pump is considered to be constant over a range of input values. Therefore, you can estimate the impact of changing one variable while keeping the others constant. When determining the ideal pump for a given application we are regularly changing the motor (i.e. altering the pump speed), or milling down the impeller diameter to tune the pump to operate at the flowrate and head needed for our system. The following laws are derived from the two coefficient equations by setting the coefficient for one operating condition (e.g. Q_{1}, n_{1}, D_{1}) equal to the coefficient for a different operating condition (e.g. Q_{2}, n_{2}, D_{2}).

== Fan affinity laws ==
The equations below are the fan affinity laws: (see for more info)

Volume flow rate:

$$\frac{Q_1}{Q_2} = \bigg(\frac{n_1}{n_2} \bigg) \bigg(\frac{D_1}{D_2} \bigg)^3$$

Head or pressure gain:

$$\frac{\Delta P_1}{\Delta P_2} = \bigg(\frac{\rho_1}{\rho_2} \bigg) \bigg(\frac{n_1}{n_2} \bigg)^2 \bigg(\frac{D_1}{D_2} \bigg)^2$$

Power consumption:

$$\frac{\dot{W}_1}{\dot{W}_2} = \bigg(\frac{\rho_1}{\rho_2} \bigg)
\bigg(\frac{n_1}{n_2} \bigg)^3 \bigg(\frac{D_1}{D_2} \bigg)^5$$

where

- $Q$ is the volumetric flow rate (units length^3/time)
- $D$ is the impeller diameter (units of length)
- $n$ is the shaft rotational speed (units of 1/time)
- $\rho$ is the fluid density (units of mass/length^3)
- $\Delta P$ is the pressure or head developed by the fan/pump (units of pressure)
- $\dot{W}$ is the shaft power (units of power, or energy/time).

These laws assume that the pump/fan efficiency remains constant i.e. $\eta_1 = \eta_2$, which is rarely exactly true, but can be a good approximation when used over appropriate frequency or diameter ranges. The exact relationship between speed, diameter, and efficiency depends on the particulars of the individual fan or pump design. Product testing or computational fluid dynamics become necessary if the range of acceptability is unknown, or if a high level of accuracy is required in the calculation. Interpolation from accurate data is also more accurate than the affinity laws.

== Obtaining affinity laws through Buckingham Pi theorem ==
Consider we have a pump/fan with the following relevant similarity variables and units:

- $Q \;\; [L^3 t^{-1}]$ (volumetric flow rate)
- $D \;\; [L]$ (impeller diameter)
- $n \;\; [t^{-1}]$ (rotational speed)
- $\rho \;\; [M L^{-3}]$ (fluid density)
- $\Delta P \;\; [M L^{-1} t^{-2}]$ (pressure gain)
- $\dot{W} \;\; [M L^2 t^{-3}]$ (shaft power)

There are $N=6$ similarity variables and $k=3$ units: $L$ (length), $t$ (time), and $M$ (mass). Electing the variables $D$, $n$ and $\rho$ to be fixed, we have $N-k = 3$ dimensionless numbers:

Dimensionless for $Q$:

$\pi_Q=D^a n^b \rho^c Q$

It is trivial to find that $a=-3$, $b=-1$ and $c=0$, therefore:

$\pi_Q=\frac{Q}{D^3 n}$

Dimensionless for $\Delta P$:

$\pi_{\Delta P}=D^a n^b \rho^c \Delta P$

Here, $a=-2$, $b=-2$ and $c=-1$, therefore:

$\pi_{\Delta P}=\frac{\Delta P}{D^2 n^2 \rho}$

Dimensionless for $\dot{W}$:

$\pi_{\dot{W}}=D^a n^b \rho^c \dot{W}$

Here, $a=-5$, $b=-3$ and $c=-1$, thus:

$\pi_{\dot{W}}=\frac{\dot{W}}{D^5 n^3 \rho}$

This simple dimensional analysis indicates that, if two fans or pumps with matching conditions (i.e, all other variables such as shape and flow dynamics are matching); then the dimensionless numbers $\pi_{Q}$, $\pi_{\Delta P}$ and $\pi_{\dot{W}}$ will be matching. This rationale results in the fan affinity laws highlighted in the previous section (i.e., $\pi_1=\pi_2$). Note that in practice, scaling the variables $D$, $n$ and $\rho$ generally results in significant changes on important parameters in the flow around the impeller blades, such as blade Reynolds number, angle of attack, as well as potential for significant changes in flow state and separation. Thus, the fan affinity laws have a very limited span of validity in practice, but can be used as a "quick and dirty" estimate for a pumping system scaling behavior that can be useful for design efforts.

== See also ==
- Centripetal force
