= Specific fan power =

Parameter that quantifies the energy-efficiency of fan air-movement systems

Specific fan power (SFP) is a parameter that quantifies the energy-efficiency of fan air-movement systems. It is a measure of the electric power that is needed to drive a fan (or collection of fans), relative to the amount of air that is circulated through the fan(s). It is not constant for a given fan, but changes with both air flow rate and fan pressure rise.

== Definition ==
SFP for a given fan system and operating point (combination of flow rate and pressure rise) is defined as:

$$SFP ={{\sum P} \over q_v}$$

where:

- ${\sum P}$ is the electrical power used by the fan (or sum of all fans in the ventilation system) [kW]
- ${q_v}$ is the gross amount of air circulated through the fan (or ventilation system) [m^{3}/s]

There are various sub-definitions of SFP for different specific applications, including SFP_{e} (building energy performance calculations), SFP_{v} (for performance verification tests), SFP_{i} (individual fan), SFP_{AHU} (air handling unit), SFP_{FCU} (fan coil unit), and SFP_{BLDG} (whole building). These are explained in and in part in. Reference 1 also describes how to account for intermittently operated fans, e.g. kitchen hoods, and part-load performance in variable air volume (VAV) systems.

SFP can be expressed in the following equivalent SI units:

$$[SFP] \equiv {kW \over m^3/s} \equiv {W \over l/s} \equiv {kJ \over m^3} \equiv {kPa}$$

== SFP and fan system efficiency ==
As you can see above, SFP can be expressed in units of pressure, since pressure is a measure of energy per m³ air. The relationship between SFP, fan pressure rise, and fan system efficiency is simply:

$$\eta_{tot} \cdot SFP = \Delta p_t$$

where:

- $\eta_{tot}$ is the overall efficiency of the driven fan system [-]
- $\Delta p_t$ is the rise in total pressure though the fan [kPa]

In the case of an ideal lossless fan system (i.e. $\eta_{tot}=1$) the SFP is exactly equal to the fan pressure rise (i.e. total pressure loss in the ventilation system). In reality the fan system efficiency is often in the range 0 to 60% (i.e. $\eta_{tot}<0.6$); it is lowest for small fans or inefficient operating points (e.g. throttled flow or free-flow). The efficiency is a function of the total losses in the fan system, including aerodynamic losses in the fan, friction losses in the drive (e.g. belt), losses in the electric motor, and variable speed drive power electronics. For more insight into how to maximise energy efficiency and minimize noise in fan systems, see ref.1

== See also ==
- Fan (mechanical)
- Industrial fans
- Specific pump power
- Efficient energy use

== Bibliography and further reading ==
- Bunn, R: Let's get specific about fan power. London: Building Services Journal. 1 August 1999
