= Specific pump power =

Pump energy-efficiency metric

Specific Pump Power (SPP) is a metric in fluid dynamics that quantifies the energy-efficiency of pump systems. It is a measure of the electric power that is needed to operate a pump (or collection of pumps), relative to the volume flow rate. It is not constant for a given pump, but changes with both flow rate and pump pressure. This term 'SPP' is adapted from the established metric Specific fan power (SFP) for fans (blowers). It is commonly used when measuring the energy efficiency of buildings.

== Definition ==
The SPP for a specific operating point (combination of flow rate and pressure rise) for a pump system is defined as:

$$SPP \equiv {{\sum P_{elec}} \over q_v}$$

where:

- ${\sum P_{elec}}$ is the electrical power used by the pump (or sum of all pumps in a system or subsystem) [kW]
- ${q_v}$ is the volumetric flow rate of fluid passing through the pump (or system) [m^{3}/s], Some countries use [l/s]

Just as for SFP (i.e. fan power), SPP is also related to pump pressure (pump head) and the pump system efficiency, as follows:

$$SPP ={\Delta p_t \over \eta_{tot}}$$

where:

- $\Delta p_t$ is the rise in total pressure across the pump system, a.k.a. pump head [kPa]. This is a property of the fluid circuit in which the pump is placed.
- $\eta_{tot}$ is the overall efficiency of the pump system [-]. This is the combined product of multiple losses, including bearing friction, impeller fluid dynamic losses, leakage losses (backflow), all losses in the motor (friction, magnetic losses, copper losses, stray load), and losses in the speed control electronics (for variable-speed pumps). The pump system efficiency is therefore not fixed, but depends on the operating point (flow and pressure).

This equation is simply an application of Bernoulli's principle in the case where the inlet and outlet have the same diameter and same height. Observe that SPP is not a property of the pump alone, but is also dependent on the pressure drop of the circuit that the pump circulates fluid through. Thus, in order to minimize energy use for pump system, one must reduce the system pressure drop (e.g. use large diameter pipes and low flow rates) in addition to selecting pumps with good intrinsic efficiency (hydrodynamically efficient with an efficient motor).

Applying the above equations enables us to estimate electrical power consumption in a number of ways:

$${\sum P_{elec}}={q_v \cdot SPP}={q_v \Delta p_t \over \eta_{tot}}={P_h \over \eta_{tot}}$$

where:

- $P_h$ is the hydraulic power ($=q_v \Delta p_t$) [kW]

== See also ==
- Pump
- Thermodynamic pump testing
- Specific fan power
- Efficient energy use
