= Whole-house fan =

Fan used to circulate air throughout a living space

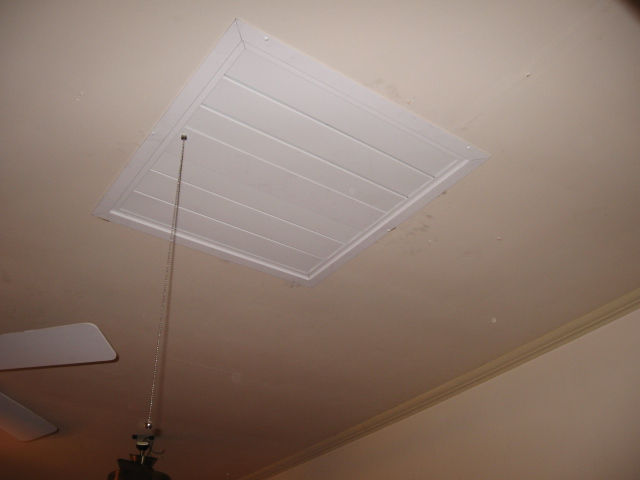
A typical whole-house fan, with louvers closed when not operating

A whole house fan is a type of fan, commonly venting into a building's attic, designed to circulate air in an entire house or other building. The fan removes hot air from the building and draws in cooler outdoor air through windows and other openings. While sometimes referred to as an "attic fan", it is not to be confused with a powered attic ventilator, which exhausts hot air from the attic to the outside through an opening in the roof or gable at a low velocity.

== Description ==
A whole house fan pulls air out of a building and forces it into the attic space or, in the case of homes without attics, through an opening in the roof or an outside wall. This forces air from the living areas into the attic and out through the gable and/or soffit vents, while at the same time drawing air from the outside into the living areas through open windows.

Powered attic ventilators, by comparison, simply push hot air out of the attic to facilitate the intake of colder air into the structure.

== History ==
Before the development of electrical power the principle of cooling a building by designing it to draw in cooler air from below and vent it from the top was known. In the absence of the forced air movement produced by a fan, careful design to promote cooling air flow was required. Thomas Jefferson, US president from 1801 to 1809, was personally involved in the designs of his residences at Monticello and Poplar Forest, and was aware of these techniques. Monticello had a large central hall and aligned windows designed to allow a cooling air-current to pass through the house, with an octagonal cupola at the top of the house drawing hot air up and out through natural convection.

Whole house fans were the only method for cooling homes in the early 1900s. Air conditioning was invented by Carrier in 1907 but did not become popular until the 1950s. Whole house fans are still ideal for cooling homes when the air outside is cooler than the air inside.

== Types ==
There are four types of whole house fans:

1. Ceiling-mounted: Mounted in the ceiling between the attic and living space.
2. Ducted: Remotely mounted away from the ceiling, typically hung from the rafters; can exhaust heat from multiple locations; operation is usually quiet compared to traditional whole-house fans.
3. Window-mounted: Mounted in a window frame. Can also take cool air in from outside.
4. Rooftop-mounted: Suitable for homes with no attic.

== Gallery ==
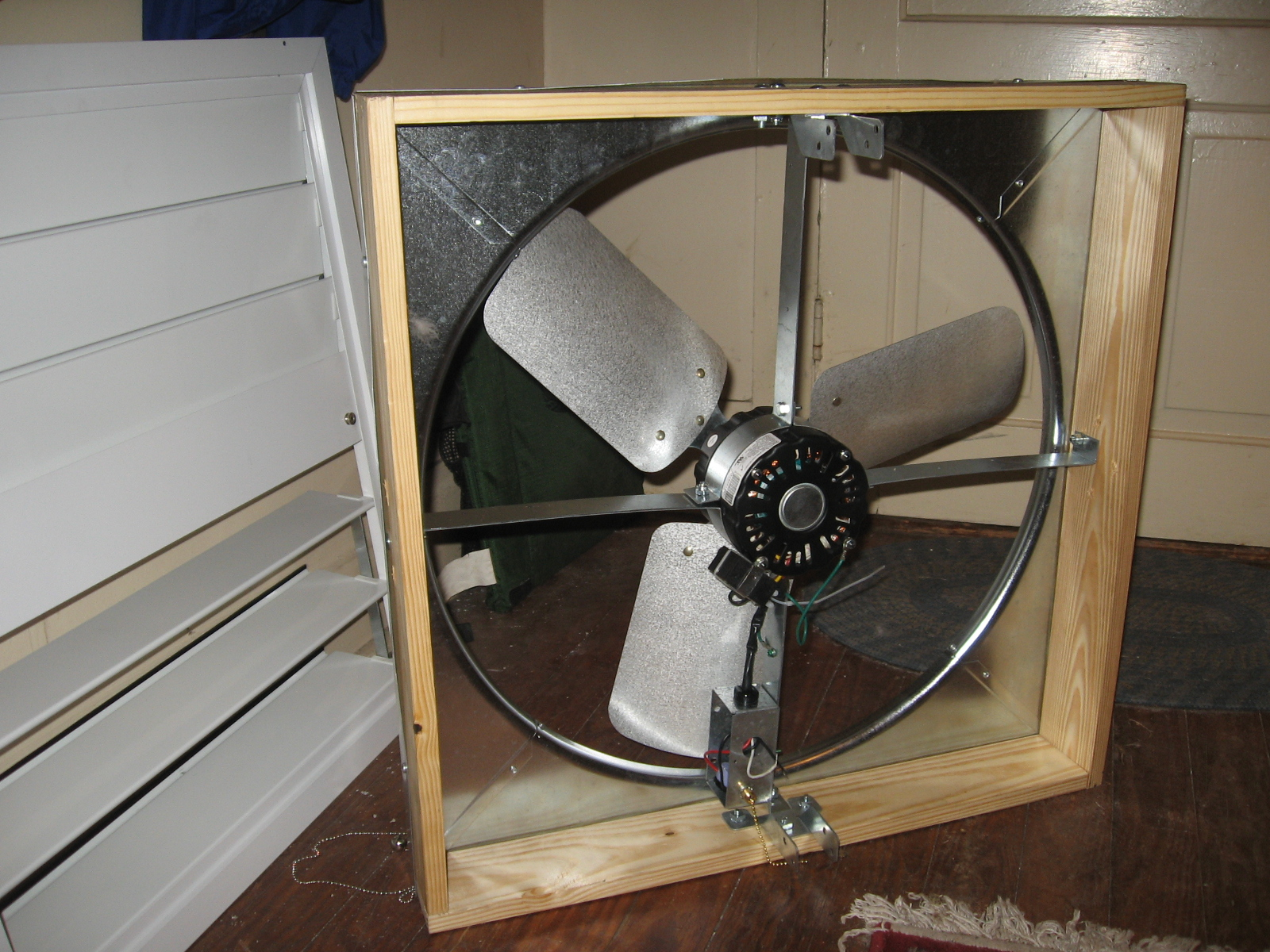
Fan unit before installation

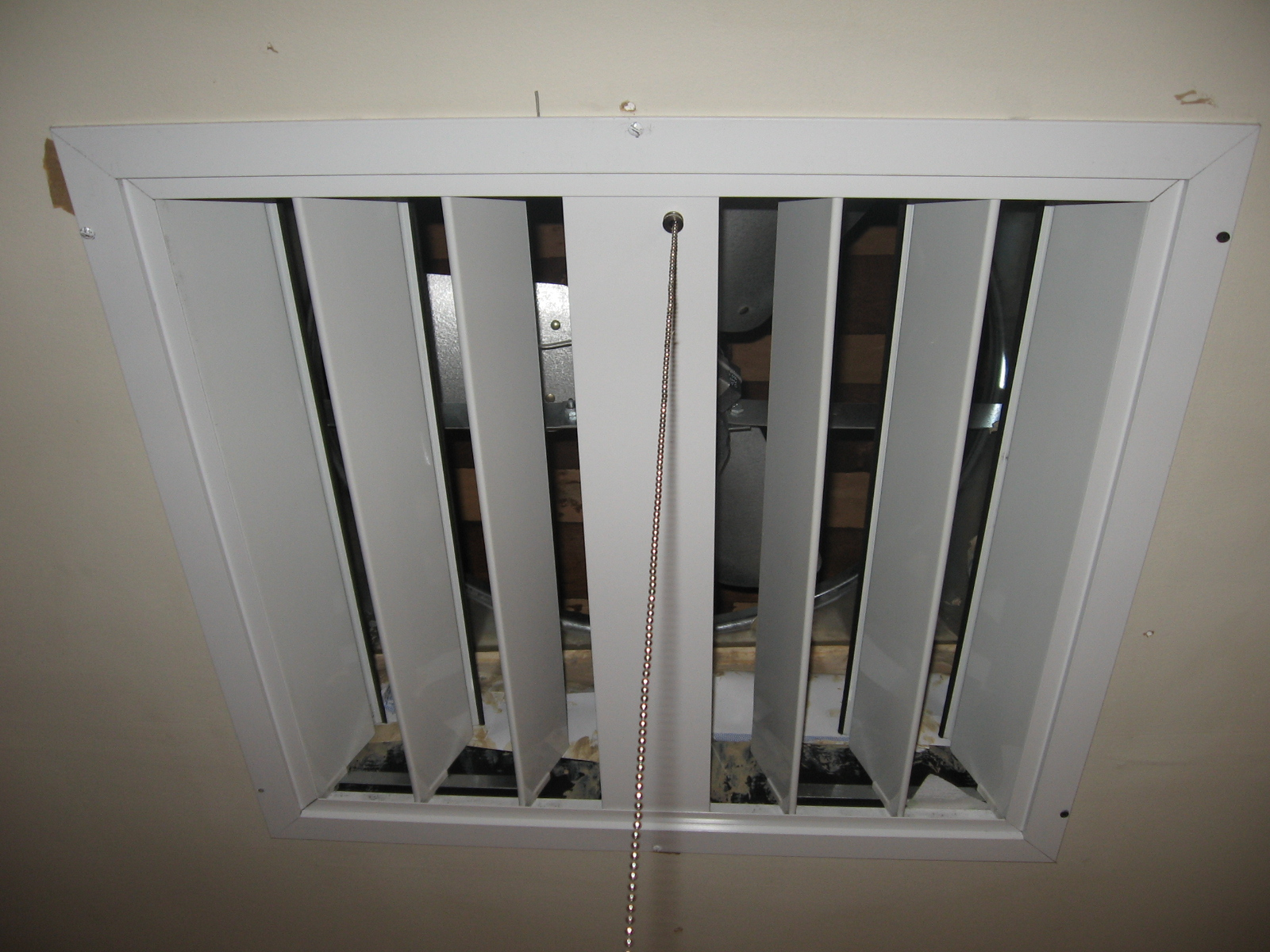
Louvers open while fan is operating

Video of a whole-house fan in operation

== See also ==
- Attic fan
- Ceiling fan
- Window fan
- Room air distribution
- Air conditioning
