= Propulsive wing =

The propulsive wing is a patented unmanned aerial vehicle (UAV) design concept developed in the 2000s with extremely high lift and internal volume.

== Purpose and mechanism of action ==
The propulsive wing has the potential to be used to develop a new class of aircraft based on an embedded, distributed cross-flow fan propulsion system within a thick wing. The fan, partially embedded within the airfoil section, draws the flow in from the suction surface and exhausts at the trailing edge. In cruise, the combination of distributed boundary-layer ingestion and wake filling increase propulsive efficiency, while distributed vectored thrust provides substantial improvements in pressure drag.

At high angle of attack, with the fan off, the airfoil fully stalls, and a large wake is present. However, when the fan is turned on, the suction effect of the fan draws the air in, eliminating the wake. The result is a significant increase in lift. In addition to maintaining flight at very high angles of attack, lift and drag forces can be managed through circulation control. In particular, if the exhaust is deflected downward as it leaves the propulsor, a circulation control effect is realized. Even at low angle of attack, high lift coefficients have been shown with CFD and validated with wind tunnel experiments.

The propulsive wing controls pitch and roll controls through vectored thrust. By distributing multiple thrust deflection flaps along the span, the high-velocity jet doubles as both the main thrust producer, as well as roll and pitch control. Collective changes in the trailing edge flaps control pitch, and spanwise differential changes control roll. Due to the circulation control effect of vectored thrust, a substantial rolling moment can be produced with very little control input.

== Research ==
In 2007 the cross-flow fan propulsive wing technology won first prize in the graduate category at the American Institute of Aeronautics and Astronautics International Student Conference.

Several international groups have investigated the propulsive wing technology and presented their results at conferences. A group from Bauhaus Luftfahrt in Munich, Germany presented computational work demonstrating the application of the cross-flow fan propulsive wing for regional aircraft applications. A research group from Nanjing, China built and tested a propulsive wing wind tunnel model, demonstrating the high lift and low drag capabilities of the design.
