= Laptop cooler =

Accessory for laptop computers

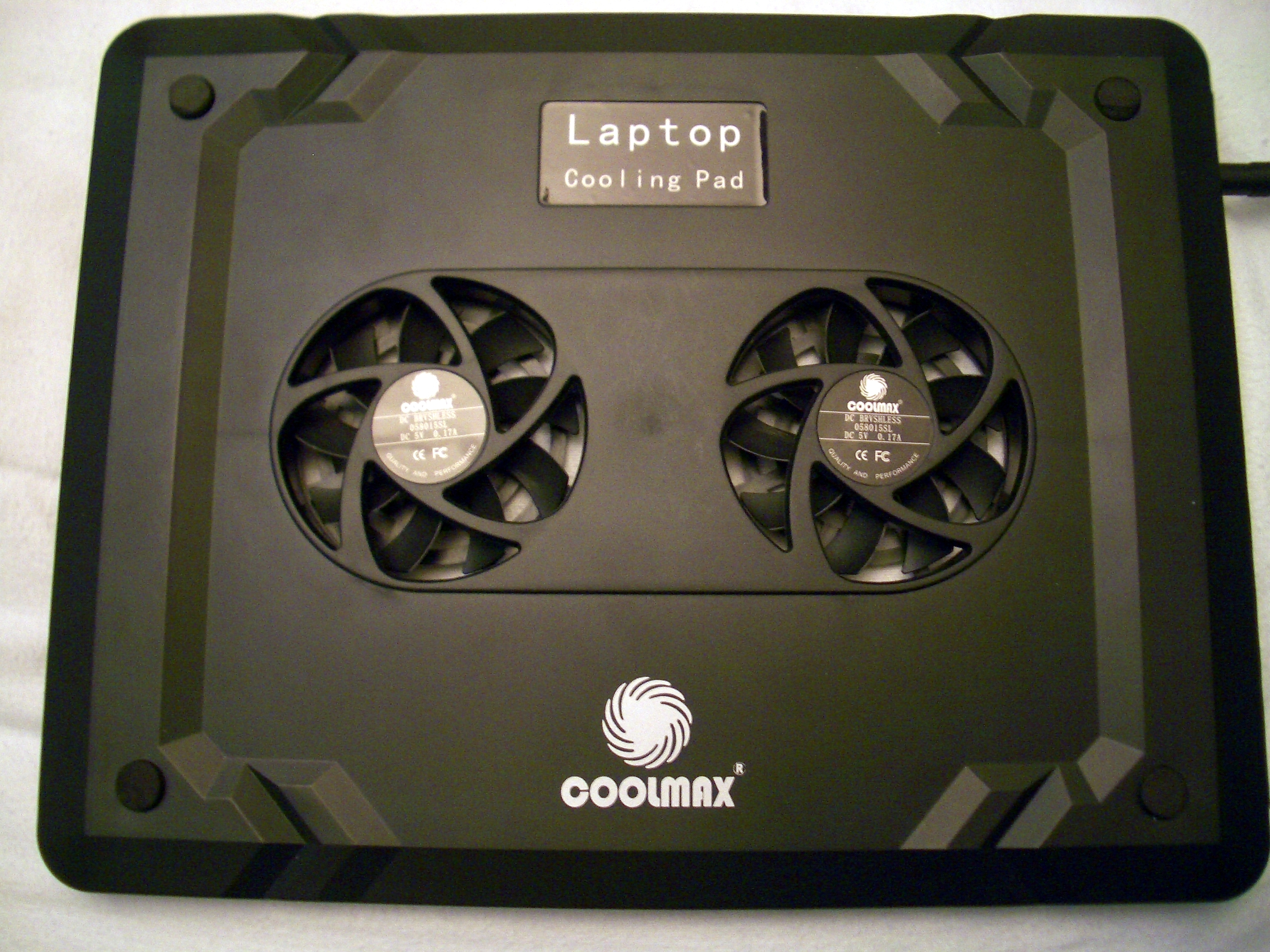
An active laptop cooler

A laptop/notebook cooler, cooling pad, cooler pad or chill mat is an accessory for laptop computers intended to reduce their temperature when the laptop is unable to sufficiently cool itself. Laptop coolers are intended to protect both the laptop from overheating and the user from suffering heat related discomfort. A cooling pad may house active or passive cooling methods and rests beneath the laptop. Active coolers move air or liquid to direct heat away from the laptop quickly, while passive methods may rely on thermally conductive materials or increasing passive airflow.

== Active coolers ==
Active laptop coolers utilize small fans to enhance airflow around the laptop's chassis, aiding in the convection of heat away from the device. These coolers typically incorporate between one and six fans, helping regulate temperature. Coolers typically run on power drawn through one of the laptop's USB ports, with some models featuring integrated USB hubs so as not to consume one of the laptop's often limited number of USB ports.

Some active coolers draw heat from the underside of the computer; others work in the opposite way – by blowing cool air towards the machine. The fan speed is adjusted manually or automatically on certain models and on others stays at a fixed speed.

Poorly designed coolers may use fans which draw more current than allowed by the USB standard. Without correct protection, such devices can cause damage to the USB power supply.

Inside the laptop, the USB power-supply has to output an additional amount of watts for the USB-powered fan, thus generating a small amount of additional heat. This additional heat generation is usually insignificant in relation to the amount of heat a fan moves away from the laptop.

Some high-end active coolers have blowers instead of fans, with filters to stop dust from entering the laptop, and have seals between the cooler and laptop surfaces to prevent recirculation of hot air from entering the laptop.

== Passive coolers ==
Typically, a conductive cooling pad allows for the cooling of a laptop without using any power. These "pads" are normally filled with an organic salt compound that allows them to absorb the heat from the laptop. They are good for a limited amount of time from around 6–8 hours of cooling. Other designs are simply a pad that elevates the laptop so that the fans in the laptop are allowed greater airflow.

Conductive cooling pads are not advisable for laptops that have fan vents built into the underside; the cooling pad blocks the vents, leading to overheating or premature system failure. The best way to determine if a cooling pad would be suitable for a particular laptop would be to look for air vents or fan vents on the laptop. If they are on the side and not on the bottom, it is usually safe to use the cooler pad; otherwise, it may not be safe to use a conductive cooler pad.

== Multi-surface cooler ==
A multi-surface cooler is a sub-type of passive cooler. It allows airflow both between the laptop base and cooler, and between the base of the cooler and the user's lap. These laptop coolers are suitable for laptops that have vents on the underside. The multi-surface cooling design typically works on any surface without blocking any vents. This makes them suitable for use on desk, lap, uneven/soft surfaces (couch, bed/duvet, carpet) and outdoors.

Some laptop coolers also feature lights that are activated along with the operation of the cooling fans. Modern versions may include customizable RGB lighting, offering a visually appealing setup that can be synchronized with other devices. Enhanced ergonomic designs with adjustable angles are available, helping users improve posture and reduce strain during extended laptop use.

== Multipurpose coolers ==
Recent advancements have resulted in coolers that are multipurpose and serve as portable workspaces. Features can include card readers for various forms of media such as key drives, memory cards, and 2.5" laptop hard disk drives. They can come with lighting systems, collapsible legs, writing pad areas, slots for books or tablets, and other extra compartments so as to serve as an all-in-one, portable desk. However, these extended designs can make the cooling stands too heavy to be carried conveniently or for a prolonged period of time.

=== Difference between laptop stand and cooler ===
A laptop stand is a device that elevates the laptop to a comfortable viewing height, promoting better posture and ergonomics. A laptop cooler, on the other hand, is designed to dissipate heat and prevent overheating by providing additional airflow to the laptop's cooling system.
