= Attic fan =

Fan used to cool an attic space

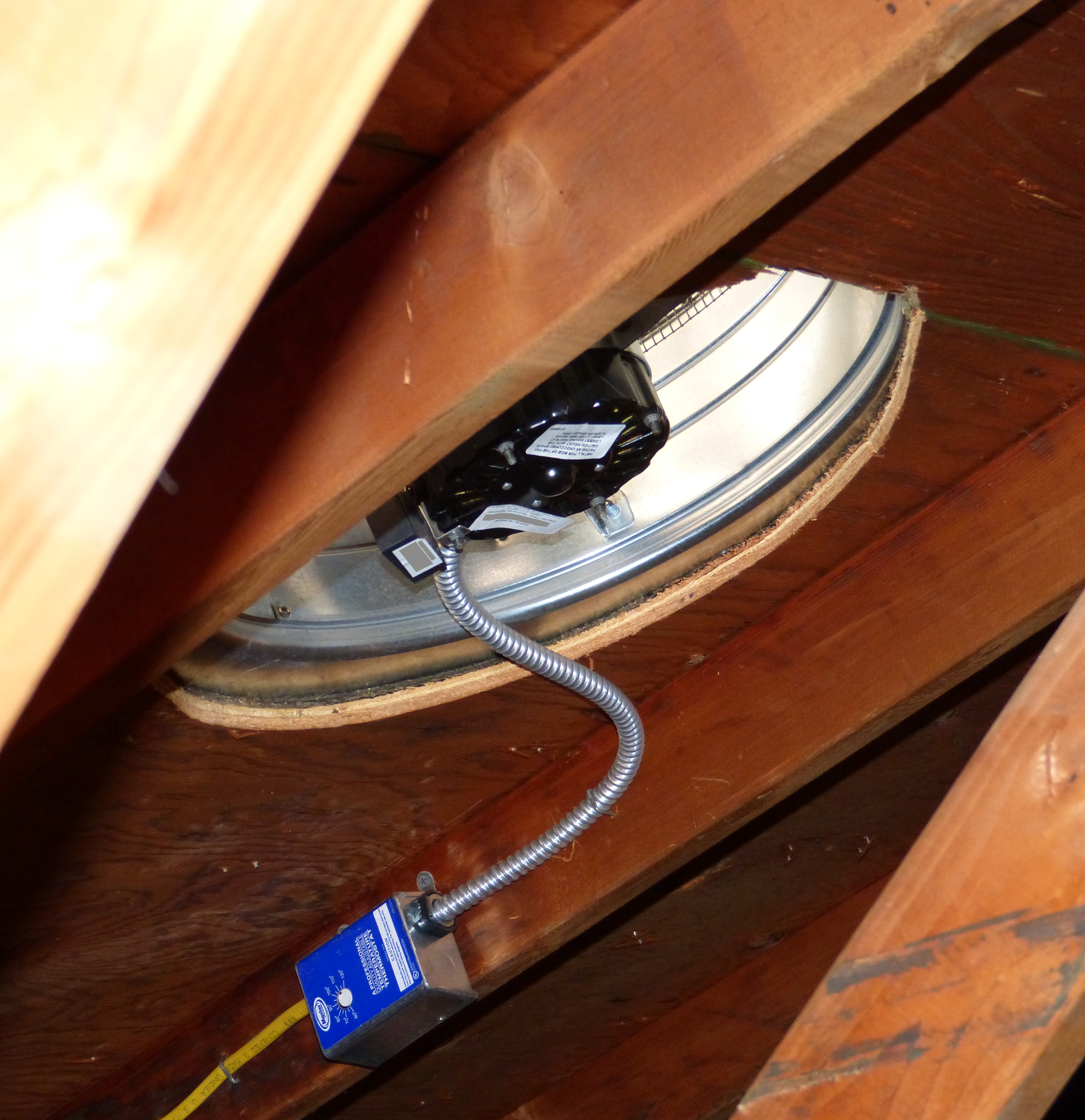
Powered attic fan installed underneath a roof

A powered attic ventilator, or attic fan, is a ventilation fan that regulates the heat level of a building's attic by exhausting hot air. A thermostat is used to automatically turn the fan off and on, although it is sometimes operated by a manual switch. An attic fan can be gable-mounted or roof-mounted. Additional vents are required to allow fresh air to be drawn in as the hot air is exhausted. Attic fans are typically used in warmer months, when temperatures in an attic can exceed 120 °F (49 °C). A fan may be installed in an attic for the purpose of cooling a whole house by venting hot air out via the attic. Such fans are often called whole-house fans.

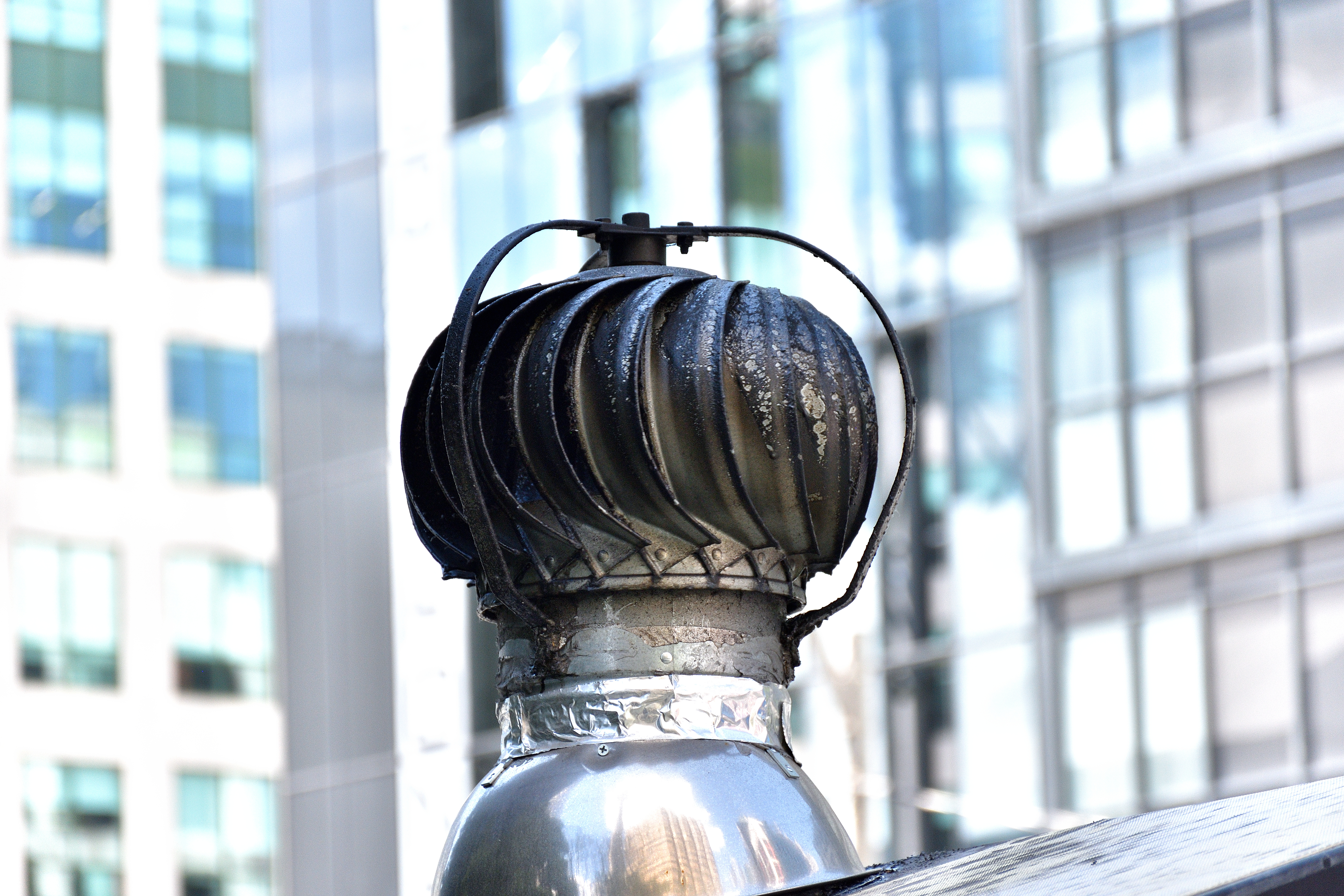
Wind-powered roof turbine ventilator

Mechanical attic ventilation fans may be powered in a variety of different ways. Most attic ventilators fitted to homes are powered by mains electricity. There has been a trend towards solar-powered attic ventilators in the interest of conserving electricity and lowering monthly utility bills. Wind-powered roof turbines, often colloquially referred to as "whirly-birds", are also used to ventilate attics and other confined spaces.

== Wiring methods ==
Attic fans may be wired in several different ways. Usually, the fan is hardwired directly into an electric circuit, and is controlled by a thermostat most commonly ranging from 60 °F (16 °C) to 120 °F (49 °C). It may also be hardwired but controlled by a switch. Another popular method is to have the fan plugged into an electric socket mounted nearby. An environmentally friendly method is to wire a specialized fan to a roof-mounted solar panel.

=== Grounding/earthing ===
Because an attic fan is made of metal, and is also subject to lightning strikes if mounted on a roof, grounding is extremely important. On some attic fans, grounding is achieved through a screw mounted on the thermostat box of the attic fan. The grounding wire is attached to the box via the screw and thereby grounds the external metal components. Most modern attic fans have this as well as a grounding wire connected directly to the motor, thereby ensuring all parts are grounded.

== Controversy ==
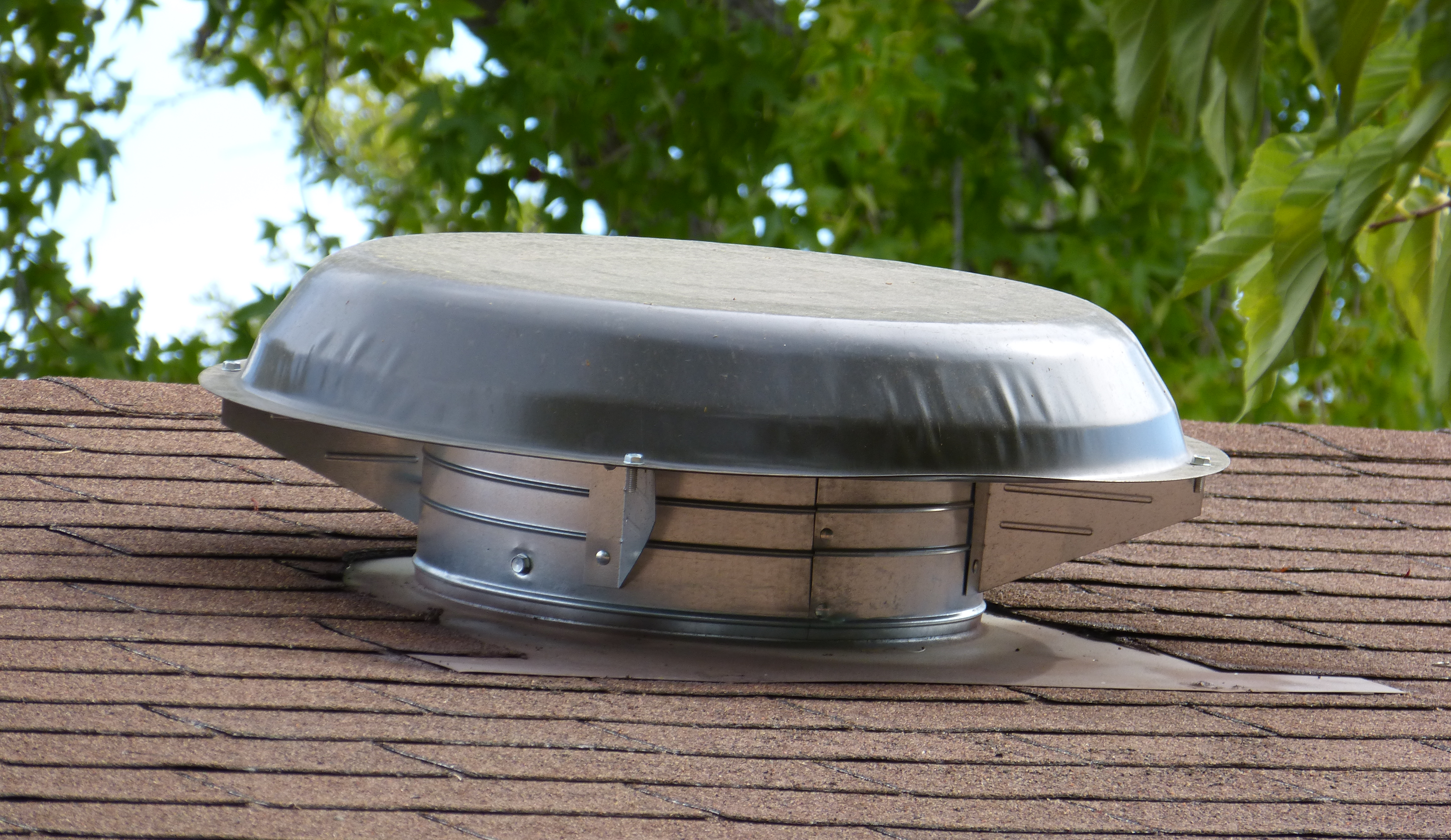
A weatherproof cap covering an attic fan

Though every situation is different, there is some controversy about the effectiveness of attic fans. It has been theorized that in some cases the negative pressure that an attic fan produces in the attic can cause conditioned air from living spaces to be pulled into the attic through cracks and lighting fixtures. This loss of conditioned air can negate the energy conservation gains that might be expected from forced cooling of the attic with a fan.

=== Fire danger ===
In the event of a fire, an operating attic fan could, in theory, spread the flames because of the air movement. To reduce the danger, louvered vents that allow air to pass through can incorporate fusible links so that fire will melt the links in which case the vent will automatically close. In addition, an automatic cutoff switch can be set up to turn off power to the fan if it detects a temperature above a preset limit.
