= Ceiling fan =

Type of fan mounted to a ceiling horizontally

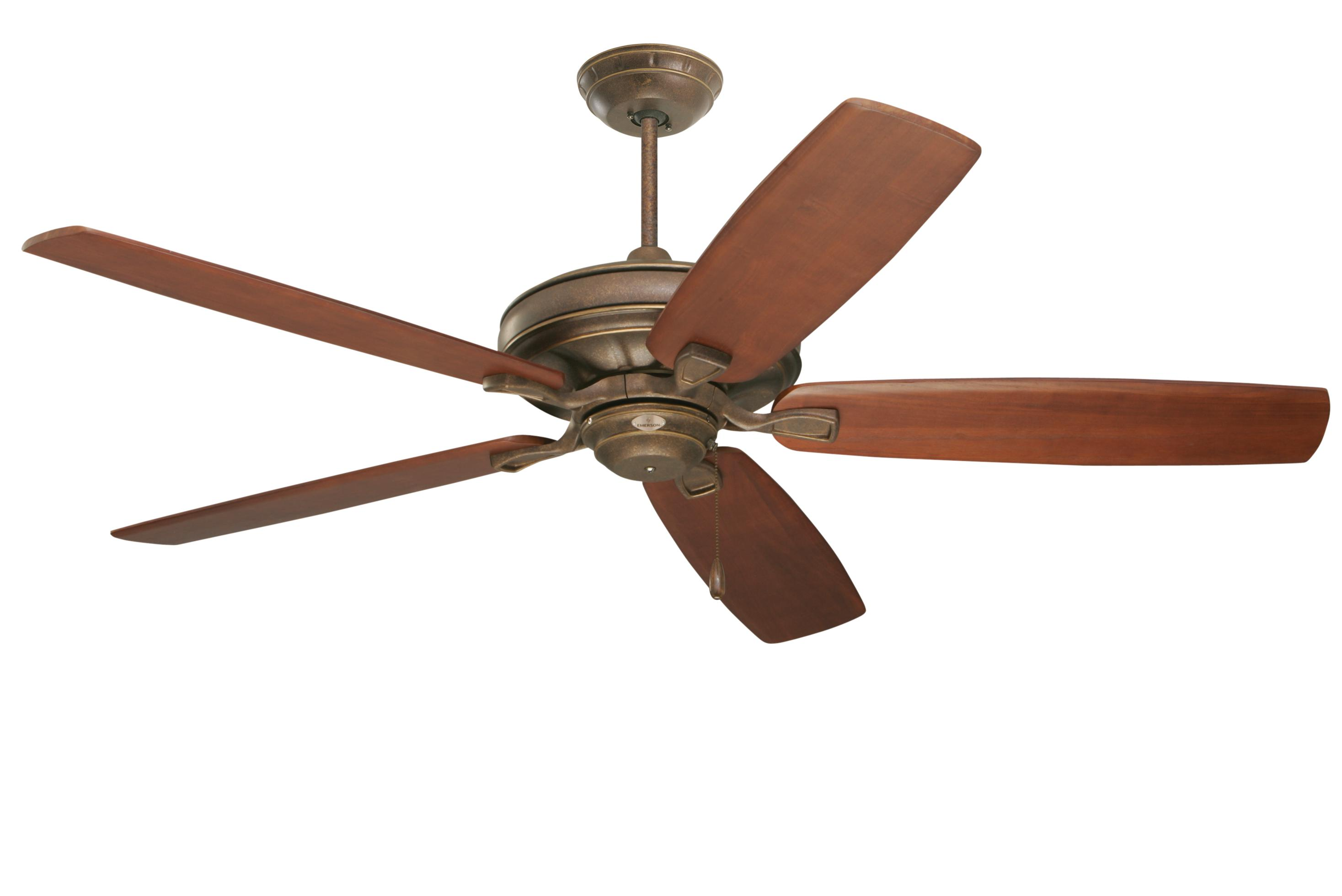
A modern ceiling fan

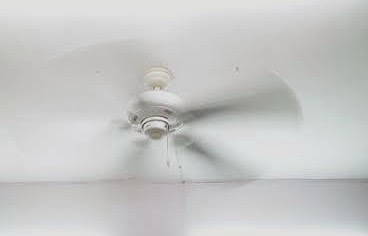
A ceiling fan mid-spin

A ceiling fan is a fan mounted on the ceiling of a room or space, usually electrically powered, that uses hub-mounted rotating blades to circulate air. They cool people effectively by increasing air speed. Fans do not reduce air temperature or relative humidity, unlike air-conditioning equipment, but create a cooling effect by helping to evaporate sweat and increase heat exchange via convection. Fans add a small amount of heat to the room mainly due to waste heat from the motor, and partially due to friction. Fans use significantly less power than air conditioning as cooling air is thermodynamically expensive. In the winter, fans move warmer air, which naturally rises, back down to occupants. This can affect both thermostat readings and occupants' comfort, thereby improving the energy efficiency of climate control. Many ceiling fan units also double as light fixtures, eliminating the need for separate overhead lights in a room.

== History ==
Punkah style ceiling fans are based on the earliest form of the fan, which was first invented in India around 500 BC. These were cut from an Indian palmyra leaf which forms its rather large blade, moving slowly in a pendular manner. Originally operated manually by a cord and nowadays powered electrically using a belt-driven system, these punkahs move air by going to and fro. In comparison to a rotating fan, it creates a gentle breeze rather than an airflow.

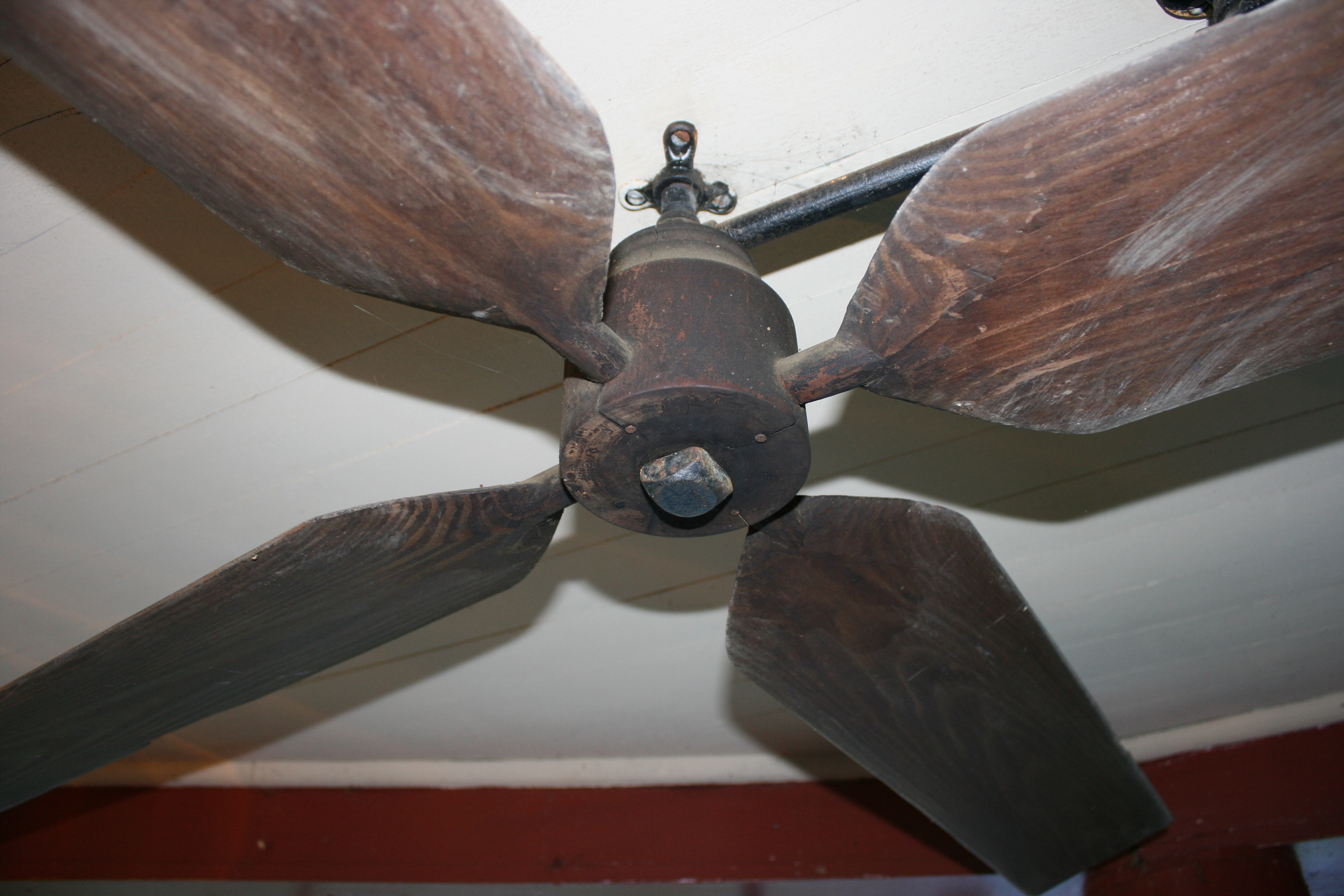
Ceiling fan originally installed in the dining room of the house in Perry's Camp, turned by the water wheel

Some of the first rotary ceiling fans appeared in the early 1860s, and 1870s in the United States. At that time, they were not powered by any form of electric motor. Instead, a stream of running water was used, in conjunction with a turbine, to drive a system of belts which would turn the blades of two-blade fan units. These systems could accommodate several fan units, and became popular in stores, restaurants, and offices. Some of these systems survive today, and can be seen in parts of the southern United States where they originally proved useful.

The electrically powered ceiling fan was invented in 1882 by Philip Diehl. He had engineered the electric motor used in the first electrically powered Singer sewing machines, and in 1882 he adapted that motor for use in a ceiling-mounted fan. Each fan had its own self-contained motor unit, with no need for belt drive.

Almost immediately he faced fierce competition due to the commercial success of the ceiling fan. He continued to make improvements to his invention and created a light kit fitted to the ceiling fan to combine both functions in one unit. By World War I most ceiling fans were made with four blades instead of the original two, which made fans quieter and allowed them to circulate more air. The early turn-of-the-century companies who successfully commercialized the sale of ceiling fans in the United States were what is today known as the Hunter Fan Company, Robbins & Myers, Century Electric, Westinghouse Corporation and Emerson Electric.

By the 1920s, ceiling fans became commonplace in the United States and had started to take hold internationally. From the Great Depression of the 1930s, until the introduction of electric air conditioning in the 1950s, ceiling fans slowly faded out of vogue in the U.S., almost falling into total disuse in the U.S. by the 1960s; those that remained were considered items of nostalgia.

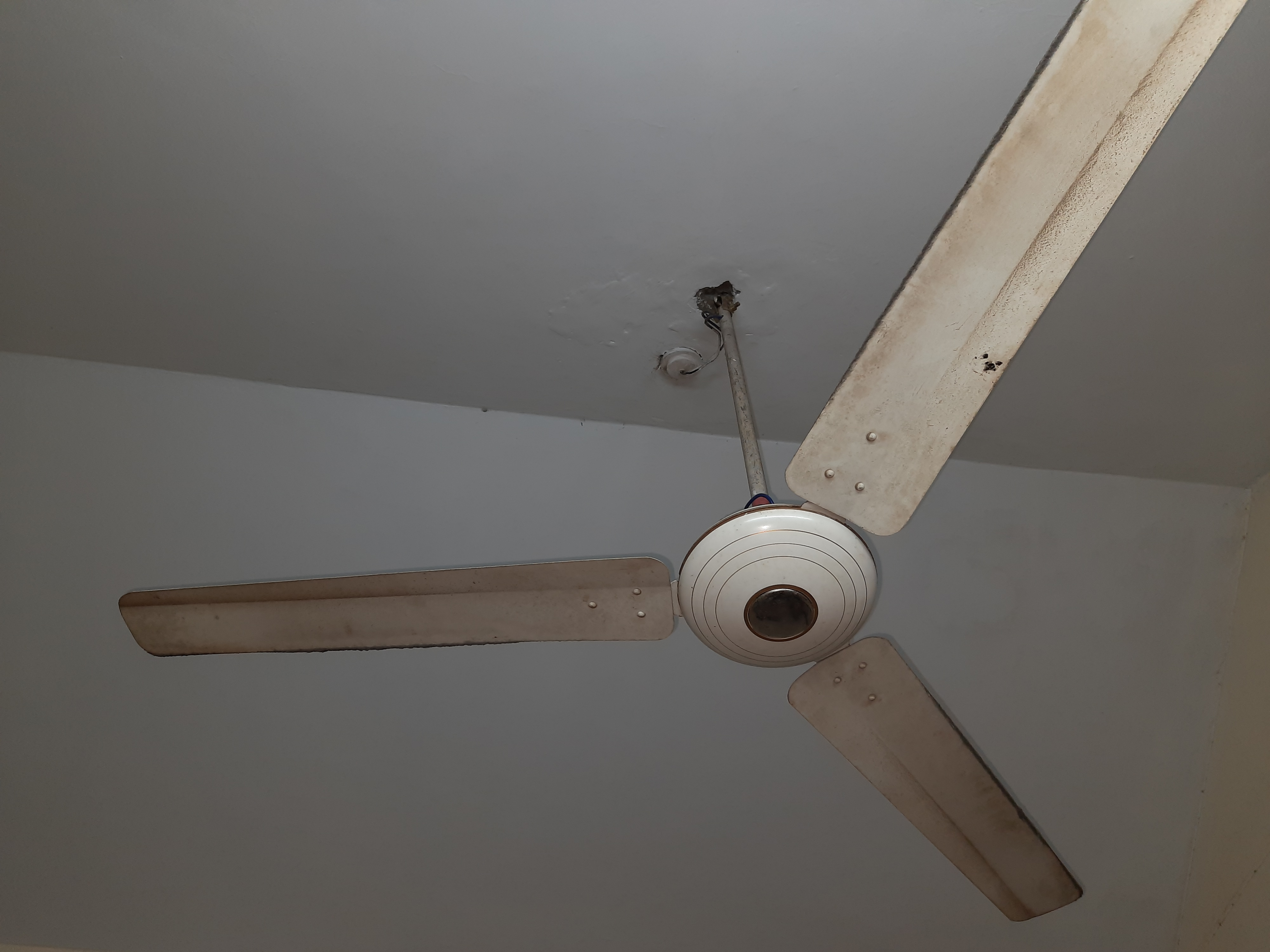
Late 1980s Usha Prima, one of the most common ceiling fans in India

Meanwhile, ceiling fans became very popular in other countries, particularly those with hot climates, such as India, Pakistan, Bangladesh and the Middle East, where a lack of infrastructure or financial resources made energy-hungry and complex freon-based air conditioning equipment impractical. In many parts of India, ceiling fans are the primary method of cooling homes, especially in middle-class households. Brands like Superfan , Usha, Crompton, and Bajaj dominate the market, but newer players have also emerged in the budget and energy-efficient segments. In 1973, Texas entrepreneur H. W. (Hub) Markwardt began importing ceiling fans into the U.S. that were manufactured in India by Crompton Greaves, Ltd. Crompton Greaves had been manufacturing ceiling fans since 1937 through a joint venture formed by Greaves Cotton of India and Crompton Parkinson of England.

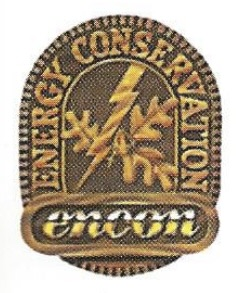

These Indian manufactured ceiling fans caught on slowly at first, but Markwardt's Encon Industries branded ceiling fans (which stood for ENergy CONservation) eventually found great success during the energy crisis of the late 1970s and early 1980s since they consumed less energy than the antiquated shaded pole motors used in most other American made fans. The fans became the energy-saving appliances for residential and commercial use by supplementing expensive air conditioning units with a column of gentle airflow.

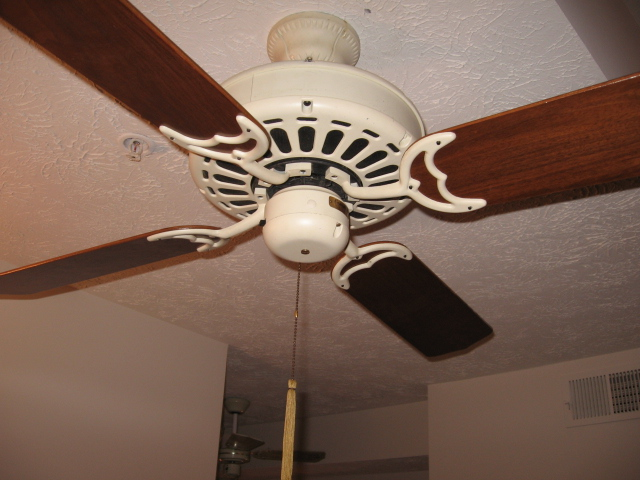
Casablanca Fan Co. "Delta" ceiling fan from the early 1980s

Due to this renewed commercial success using ceiling fans effectively as an energy conservation application, many American manufacturers also started to produce, or significantly increase the production of, ceiling fans. In addition to the imported Encon ceiling fans, the Casablanca Fan Company was founded in 1974. Other American manufacturers of the time included the Hunter Fan Co. (which was then a division of Robbins & Myers, Inc), FASCO (F. A. Smith Co.), and Emerson Electric; which was often branded as Sears-Roebuck. Smaller, short-lived companies include NuTone, Southern Fan Co., A&G Machinery Co., Homestead, Hallmark, Union, Lasko, and Evergo.

Through the 1980s and 1990s, ceiling fans remained popular in the United States. Many small American importers, most of them rather short-lived, started importing ceiling fans. Throughout the 1980s, the balance of sales between American-made ceiling fans and those imported from manufacturers in India, Taiwan, Hong Kong and eventually China changed dramatically with imported fans taking the lion's share of the market by the late 1980s. Even the most basic U.S-made fans sold for $200 to $500, while the most expensive imported fans rarely exceeded $150.

Ceiling fan technology has not evolved much since 1980, with a notable exception being the semi-recent increase in availability of energy-efficient, remote/app controlled brushless DC fans to the masses. However, important inroads have been made in design by companies such as Monte Carlo, Minka Aire, Quorum, Craftmade, Litex and Fanimation—offering higher price ceiling fans with more decorative value. In 2001, Washington Post writer Patricia Dane Rogers wrote, "Like so many other mundane household objects, these old standbys are going high-style and high-tech."

== Uses ==
Ceiling fans have multiple functions. Fans increase mixing in a ventilated space, which leads to more homogenous environmental conditions. Moving air is generally preferred over stagnant air, especially in warm or neutral environments, so fans are useful in increasing occupant satisfaction. Because fans do not change air temperature and humidity, but move it around, fans can aid in both the heating and cooling of a space. Because of this, ceiling fans are often an instrumental element of low energy HVAC, passive cooling or natural ventilation systems in buildings. Depending on the energy use of the fan system, fans can be an efficient way to improve thermal comfort by allowing for a higher ambient air temperature while keeping occupants comfortable. Fans are an especially economic choice in warm, humid environments.

Ceiling fans can be controlled together in a shared space, and can also be individually controlled in a home or office setting. In an office environment, individually controlled ceiling fans can have a significant positive impact on thermal comfort, which has been shown to increase productivity and satisfaction among occupants. Ceiling fans aid in the distribution of fresh air in both mechanically ventilated and naturally ventilated spaces. In naturally ventilated spaces, ceiling fans are effective at drawing in and circulating fresh outdoor air. In mechanically ventilated spaces, fans can be focused to channel and circulate conditioned air in a room.

=== Direction ===
The direction that a fan spins should change based on whether the room needs to be heated or cooled. Unlike air conditioners, fans only move air—they do not directly change its temperature. Therefore, ceiling fans that have a mechanism for reversing the direction in which the blades push air (most commonly an electrical switch on the unit's switch housing, motor housing, or lower canopy) can help in both heating and cooling.

While ceiling fan manufacturers (mainly Emerson) have had electrically reversible motors in production since the 1930s, most fans made before the mid-1970s are either not reversible at all or mechanically reversible (have adjustable blade pitch) instead of an electrically reversible motor. In this case, the blades should be pitched with the upturned edge leading for downdraft, and with the downturned edge leading for updraft. Hunter's "Adaptair" mechanism is perhaps the most well-known example of mechanical reversibility.

For cooling, the fan's direction of rotation should usually be set so that air is blown downward—usually counter-clockwise from beneath, but dependent upon manufacturer. The blades should lead with the upturned edge as they spin. The breeze created by a ceiling fan creates a wind chill effect, speeding the evaporation of perspiration on human skin, which makes the body's natural cooling mechanism much more efficient. As a result of this phenomenon, the air conditioning thermostat can be set a few degrees higher than normal when a fan is in operation, greatly reducing power consumption. Since the fan works directly on the body, rather than by changing the temperature of the air, it is recommended to switch all ceiling fans off when a room is unoccupied, to further reduce power consumption. In some cases, like when a fan is near walls like in a hallway, updraft may cause better airflow. Another example of how updraft can cause better cooling is when the ceiling fan is in middle of a bedroom with a loft bed near a wall, meaning breeze can be felt better when airflow is coming from the top.

For heating, ceiling fans should be set to blow the air upward. Air naturally stratifies, i.e. warmer air rises to the ceiling while cooler air sinks, meaning that colder air settles near the floor where people spend most of their time. A ceiling fan, with its direction of rotation set so that the warmer air on the ceiling is pushed down along the walls and into the room, heating the cooler air. This avoids blowing a stream of air directly at the occupants of the room, which would tend to cool them. This action works to equalize, or even out the temperature in the room, making it cooler at ceiling level, but warmer near the floor. Thus the heating thermostat in the area can be set a few degrees lower to save energy while maintaining the same level of comfort.

Though reversible models of industrial-grade ceiling fans do exist, most are not reversible. High ceiling heights in most industrial applications render reversibility unnecessary. Instead, industrial ceiling fans typically de-stratify heat by blowing hot air at ceiling level directly down toward the floor.

=== Blade shape ===
Residential ceiling fans, which are almost always reversible, typically use flat, paddle-like blades, which are equally effective in downdraft and updraft. Industrial ceiling fans typically are not reversible and operate only in downdraft, and therefore are able to make effective use of blades that are contoured to have a downdraft bias.

More recently, however, residential ceiling fan designers have been making increasing use of contoured blades in an effort to boost ceiling fan efficiency. This contour, while serving to effectively boost the fan's performance while operating in downdraft, can hinder performance when operating in updraft.

=== Air conditioning ===
The most commonplace use of ceiling fans today is in conjunction with an air conditioning unit. Without an operating ceiling fan, air conditioning units typically have both the tasks of cooling the air inside the room and circulating it. Provided the ceiling fan is properly sized for the room in which it is operating, its efficiency of moving air far exceeds that of an air conditioning unit, therefore, for peak efficiency, the air conditioner should be set to a low fan setting and the ceiling fan should be used to circulate the air.

=== Flicker and strobing ===
Ceiling fans are usually installed in a space with other lighting fixtures, but if the fan is positioned too close to a light panel or fixture, a strobe or flicker effect may occur. A strobe or flicker effect is a phenomenon which occurs when light brightens and dims consistently as it penetrates and passes through a moving ceiling fan. This is due to the fan blades intermittently blocking the light, causing shadows to appear across the room's interior surface leading to visual discomfort. The rotating area of a moving fan blade can commonly obstruct the light source when a ceiling fan is positioned underneath an artificial lighting fixture, which can be increasingly distracting to occupants within the space. To ensure that the ceiling fans seamlessly co-exists with the lighting fixtures to avoid strobing, it is recommended that the horizontal separation between the blade and the lighting fixture is maximized. In addition, increasing the vertical distance between the light and the blade will reduce the concentration and frequency of strobing. Never position a light fixture directly above a ceiling fan's blades, and downlight and point source fixtures should be set such that their beam angles do not cross them. Generally, to ensure uniformly adequate light levels, any recessed ceiling lighting and fixtures that emit light above the level of the fan blades should be placed as far away from the ceiling fan as possible. Another recommended strategy is to ensure that the light's angle of dispersion or the field angle is reduced, which minimizes the strobing effect from the fan blades. It is well known that human eyes can detect flicker at low frequencies (between 60 and 90 hertz), but not at high frequencies (beyond 100 hertz), which is also known as non-visible flicker. The strobe effect can have significant physiological and psychological effect on humans. Two test rooms were utilized in an experiment to compare the effects of visual flicker induced the ceiling fan. The findings revealed statistical proof that one out of three cognitive performances (digit-span task) may have been reduced slightly as a result of an increased effect of visual flicker.

== Parts ==
The key components of a ceiling fan are the following:

- An electric motor
- Blades (also known as paddles or wings) usually made from solid wood, plywood, steel, aluminium, MDF or plastic
- Blade irons (also known as blade brackets, blade arms, blade holders, or flanges), which hold the blades and connect them to the motor.
- Flywheel, a metal, plastic, or tough rubber double-torus that is attached to the motor shaft and to which the blade irons may be attached. The flywheel inner ring is locked to the shaft by a lock-screw and the blade irons to the outer ring by screws or bolts that feed into tapped metal inserts. Rubber or plastic flywheels may become brittle and break, a common cause of fan failure. Replacing the flywheel may require disconnecting wiring and requires removing the switch housing that is in the way of the flywheel to be removed and replaced.
- Rotor, an alternative to blade irons. First patented by industrial designer Ron Rezek in 1991, the one-piece die-cast rotor receives and secures the blades and bolts right to the motor, eliminating most balance problems and minimizing exposed fasteners.
- A mechanism for mounting the fan to the ceiling such as:
  - Ball-and-socket system. With this system, there is a metal or plastic hemisphere mounted on the end of the downrod; this hemisphere rests in a ceiling-mounted metal bracket, or self-supporting canopy, and allows the fan to move freely (which is very useful on vaulted ceilings).
  - J-hook and Shackle clamp. A type of mounting system where the ceiling fan hangs on a hardened metal hook, screwed into the ceiling or bolted through a steel I-beam. The fan can be mounted directly on a ceiling hook, making the junction box optional. A porcelain or rubber grommet is used to reduce vibration and to electrically isolate the fan from the ceiling hook. This type of mounting is most common on antique ceiling fans and ceiling fans made for industrial use. A variation of this system using a U-bracket secured to the ceiling by means of lag bolts is often used on heavy-duty ceiling fans with electrically reversible motors in order to reduce the risk of the fan unscrewing itself from the ceiling while running in clockwise. This type of mount is ideally suited to the RC flat roof with metal hooks and has become ubiquitous in South Asia, including Bangladesh, India, Pakistan, etc.
  - Flush mount (also known as "low profile" or "hugger" ceiling fans). These are specially designed fans with no downrod or canopy like a traditional mount fan. The motor housing appears to be directly attached to the ceiling, that is where the name "hugger" comes from. They are ideal for rooms with low ceilings ranging in height between 2.286 m and 2.5908 m. A disadvantage to this design is that since the blades are mounted so close to the ceiling, air movement is greatly reduced.

Some ball-and-socket fans can be mounted using a low-ceiling adapter, purchased specially from the fan's manufacturer. This allows the same design to be used in both a high and low ceiling environment, simplifying the buying decision for consumers. In recent years, it has become increasingly common for a ball-and-socket fan to be designed such that the canopy (ceiling cover piece) can optionally be screwed directly into the top of the motor housing, thus eliminating the need for a downrod. The whole fan can be secured directly onto the ceiling mounting bracket; this is often referred to as a dual-mount or tri-mount.

Other components, which vary by model and style, can include:

- A downrod, a metal pipe used to suspend the fan from the ceiling. Downrods come in many lengths and widths, depending on the fan type.
- A decorative encasement for the motor (known as the "motor housing").
- A switch housing (also known as a "switch cup" or "nose column"), a metal or plastic cylinder mounted below and in the center of the fan's motor. The switch housing is used to conceal and protect various components, which can include wires, capacitors, and switches; on fans that require oiling, it often conceals the oil reservoir which lubricates the bearings. The switch housing also makes for a convenient place to mount a light kit.
- Blade badges, decorative adornments attached to the visible underside of the blades for the purpose of concealing the screws used to attach the blades to the blade irons.
- Assorted switches used for turning the fan on and off, adjusting the speed at which the blades rotate, changing the direction in which the blades rotate, and operating any lamps that may be present. Some fans have remote controls to adjust speed and turn the light off and on.
- Lamps
  - Uplights, which are installed on top of the fan's motor housing and project light up onto the ceiling, for aesthetic reasons (to "create ambience")
  - Downlights, often referred to as a "light kit", which add ambient light to a room and can be used to replace any ceiling-mounted lamps that were displaced by the installation of a ceiling fan
  - Decorative lights mounted inside the motor housing—in this type of setup, the motor housing side-band often has glass or acrylic panel sections, which allow light to shine though.

== Operation ==
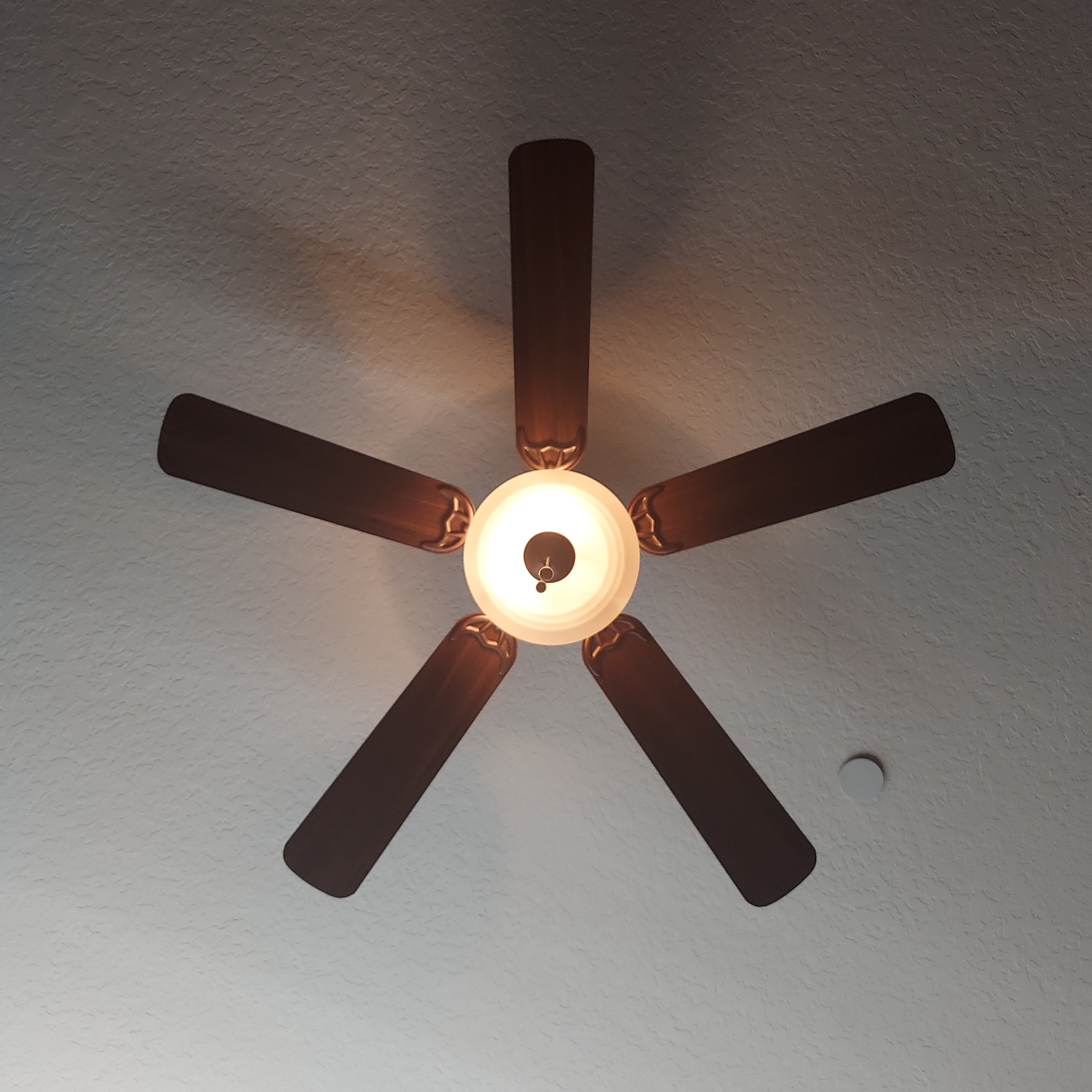
A modern pull-chain operated ceiling fan with its light on

The way in which a fan is operated depends on its manufacturer, style, and the era in which it was made. Operating methods include:

- Pull-chain/pull-cord control. This style of fan is equipped with a metal-bead chain or cloth cord which, when pulled, cycles the fan through the operational speed(s) and then back to off. These fans typically have between one and four speeds. Fans with lights usually have a second pull chain which is to control light, and it is usually on/off, but sometimes it is three way, in which case it would be some lights, other lights, all lights, and off. Some fans, usually outdoor rated or Canadian, have another pull chain to change direction.
- Variable-speed control. During the 1970s and into the mid-1980s, fans were often produced with a solid-state variable-speed control. This was a dial mounted either on the body of the fan or in a gang box at the wall, and when turned in either direction, continuously varied the speed at which the blades rotated—similar to a dimmer switch for a light fixture. A few fans substituted a rotary click-type switch for the infinite-speed dial, providing a set number of set speeds (usually ranging from four to ten).
  - Different fan manufacturers used variable-speed controls in different ways:
    - The variable-speed dial controlling the fan entirely; to turn the fan on, the user turns the knob until it clicks out of the "off" position, and can then choose the fan's speed.
    - Variable speed pull-chain. This setup is similar to the variable-speed dial discussed above, except that a "dual chain" setup is used to turn the potentiometer shaft.
    - A pull-chain present along with the variable-speed control; the dial can be set in one place and left there, with the pull-chain serving only to turn the fan on and off. Many of these fans have an option to wire an optional light kit to this pull-chain in order to control both the fan and the light with one chain. Using this method, the user can have either the fan or light on individually, both on, or both off.
    - Vari-Lo. A pull-chain and variable-speed control are present. Such a fan has two speeds controlled by a pull-chain: high (full power, independent of the position of the variable-speed control), and "Vari-Lo" (speed determined by the position of the variable-speed control). In some cases, maximum speed on Vari-Lo setting is slower than high.

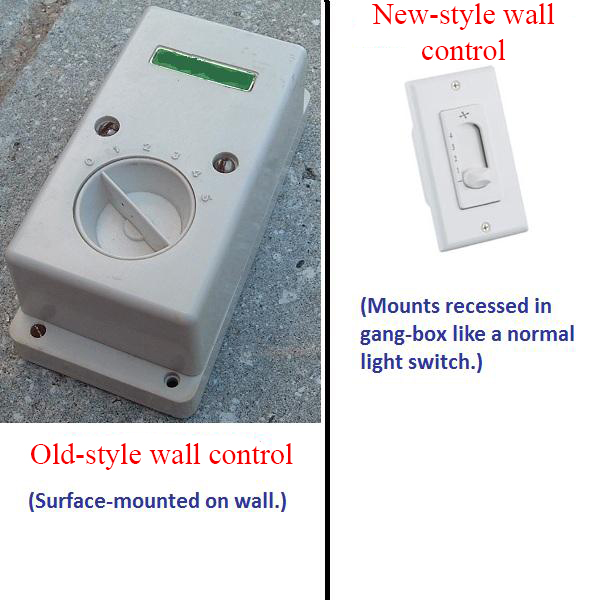
Old-style choke and new-style capacitor based wall control

- Wall-mounted control. Some fans have their control(s) mounted on the wall instead of on the fans themselves; these are very common with industrial and HVLS fans. Such controls usually use proprietary or specialized switches.
  - Mechanical wall control. This style of switch takes varying physical forms. The wall control, which contains a motor speed regulator of some sort, determines how much power is delivered to the fan and therefore how fast it spins. Older such controls employed a choke—a large iron-cored coil—as their regulator; these controls were typically large, boxy, and surface-mounted on the wall. They had anywhere from four to eight speeds. Newer versions of this type of control do not use a choke as such, but much smaller capacitors and solid-state circuitry; the switch is typically mounted in a standard in-wall gang box. The old one is called electrical fan regulator that works on the principle of reducing voltage and the new one is called electronic fan regulator that works on the principle of switching that control the time duration of the power supply. The new electronic fan regulator is more power efficient.
  - Digital wall control. With this style of control, all of the fan's functions—on/off status, speed, the direction of rotation, and any attached light fixtures—are controlled by a computerized wall control, which typically does not require any special wiring. Instead, it uses the normal house wiring to send coded electrical pulses to the fan, which decodes and acts on them using a built-in set of electronics. This style of control typically has anywhere from three to seven speeds.
- Wireless remote control. In recent years, remote controls have dropped in price to become cost-effective for controlling ceiling fans. They may be supplied with fans or fitted to an existing fan. The hand-held remote transmits radio frequency or infrared control signals to a receiver unit installed in the fan. However, these may not be ideal for commercial installations as the controllers require batteries. They can also get misplaced, especially in installs with many fans.
- Directional Switch. Most ceiling fans typically feature a small slide switch on the motor body of the fan itself, which controls the direction in which the fan rotates. In one position, the fan is caused to rotate clockwise, in the other position the fan is caused to rotate counter-clockwise. Given that the fan blades are typically slanted, this results in the air either being drawn upwards or brought downwards. While the user can select which they prefer, typically air is blown downwards in summer and lifted upwards in winter. The downwards blowing is experienced as "cooling" in summer, while the upwards convection brings ceiling-hugging warm air back down throughout the room in winter.

== Classifications ==
Ceiling fans can be classified into three main categories based on their use and functionality. Each type offers some unique advantages over the others and hence is suitable for a specific application. These include household, industrial and large-diameter fans.

- Household fans usually have 4, 5 or 6 wooden blades, a decorative motor housing, and a standard motor with a three speed pull-chain switch control. These fans come in two varieties, with or without a light kit, depending on the price and consumer preferences.
- Commercial or industrial ceiling fans are typically used in stores, schools, churches, offices, factories, and warehouses. Such a fan is designed to be more cost-effective and energy-efficient than its household counterpart. Industrial or commercial ceiling fans typically use three blades, typically made of either steel or aluminum, and operate at high speed. These energy-efficient ceiling fans are designed to push massive amounts of air across large, wide open spaces. From the late 1970s to the mid-1980s, metal-bladed industrial ceiling fans were popular in lower-income American households, likely due to them being priced lower than wood-bladed models. Industrial style ceiling fans are very popular for household applications in Asia and the Middle East.

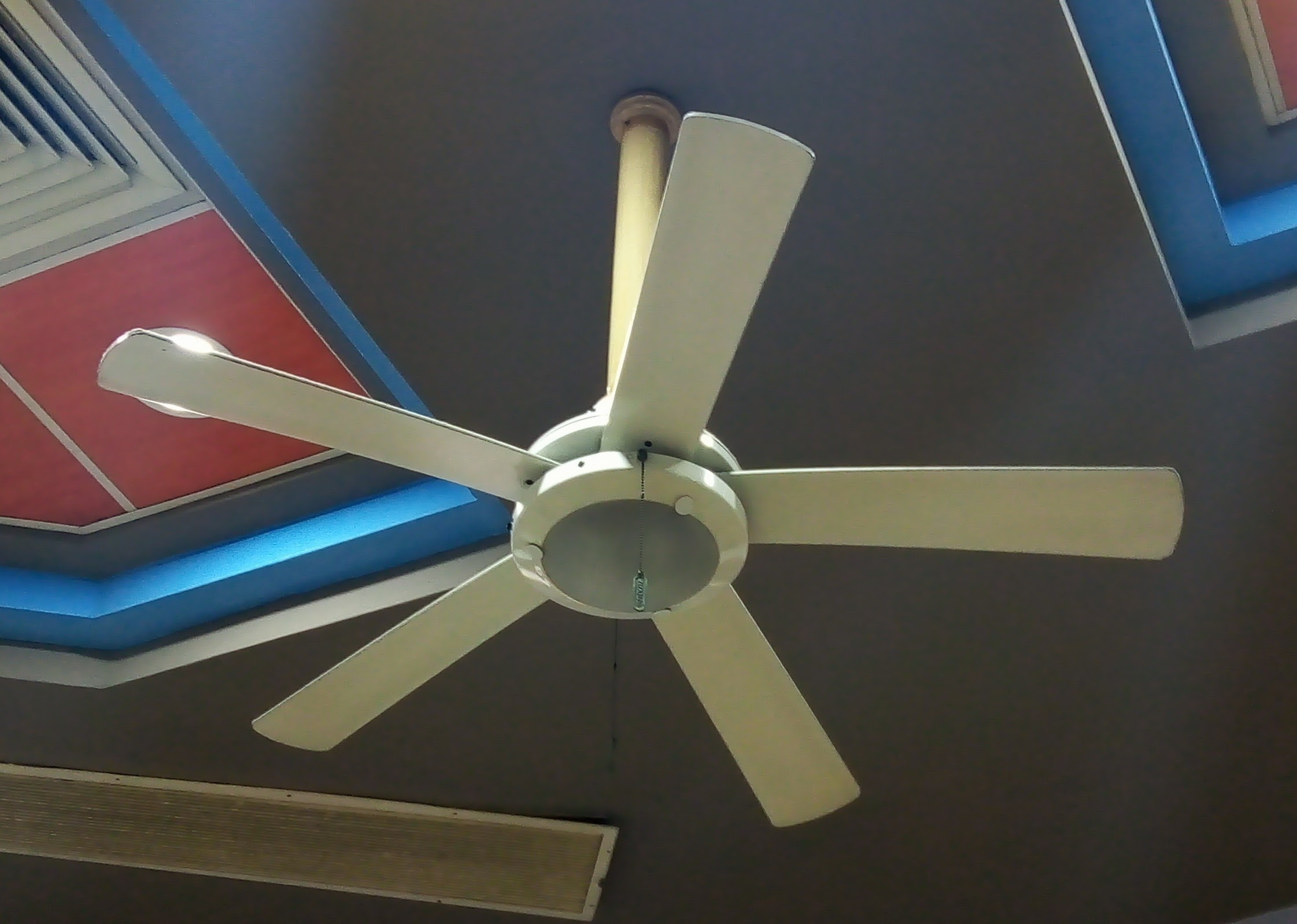
A 5-blade Encon ceiling fan in a restaurant

- HVLS fans are large-diameter ceiling fans, intended for large spaces such as large warehouses, hangars, shopping malls, railway platforms and gymnasiums. These fans generally spin at a lower speed but due to their large diameter, ranging between 7' and 24' (2.1 m and 7.3 m), can provide a large area with a gentle breeze. Modern HVLS fans use airfoil-style blades for optimized air movement at a reduced energy cost. One of the most notable manufactures of HVLS fans is Big Ass Fans.

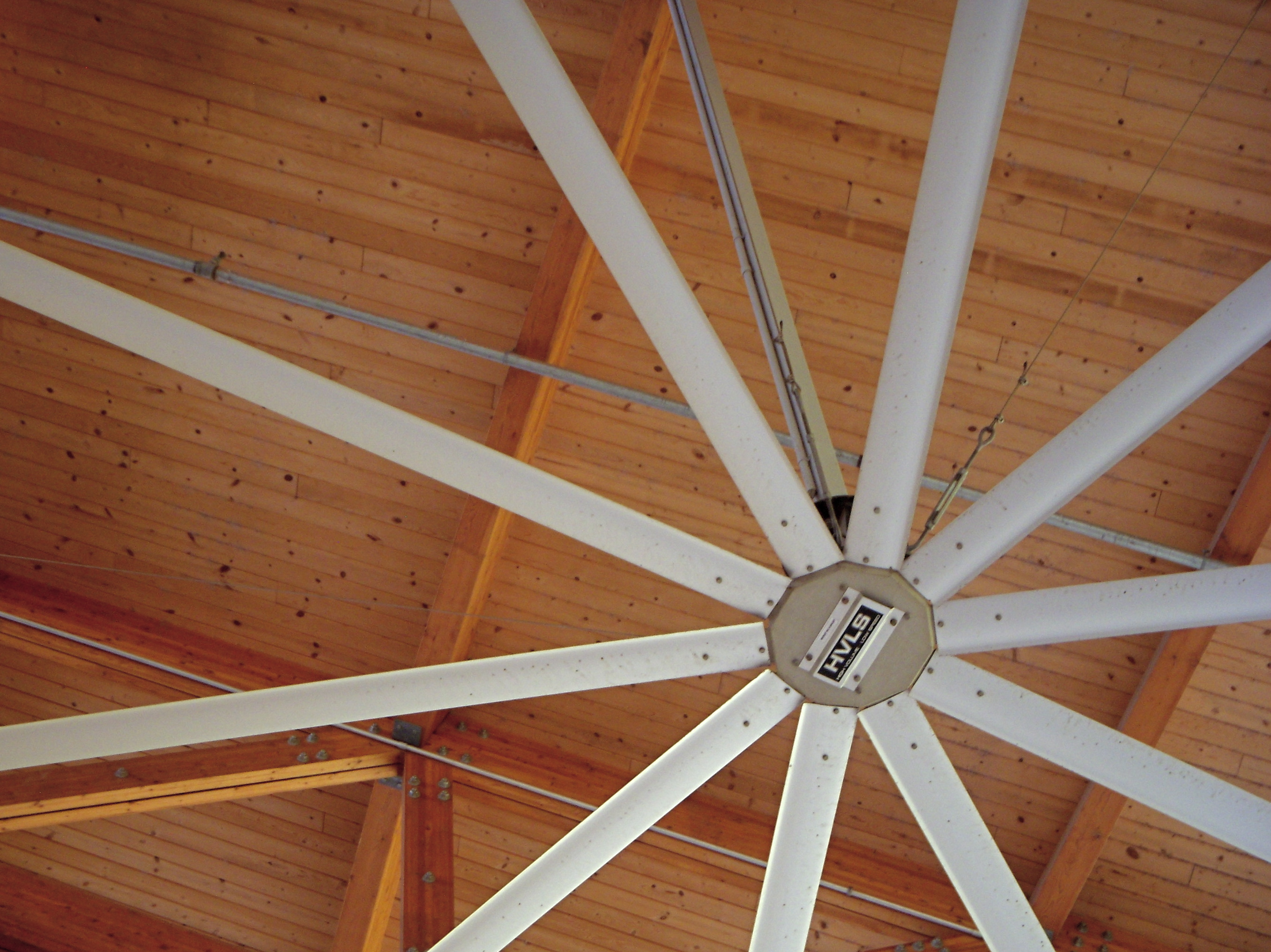
A High-volume low-speed fan

- Indoor/outdoor ceiling fans are designed for use in partially enclosed or open outdoor spaces. The body and blades are usually made of materials and finishes that are not as drastically affected by moisture, temperature swings, or humidity as traditional materials and finishes. UL Damp-rated fans are suitable for covered outdoor areas like patios and porches that are not directly exposed to rainwater from above, as well as moisture-prone indoor areas such as bathrooms and laundry rooms. In open places where the fan may come in contact with water, one must use wet-rated fans. UL Wet-rated fans have a completely sealed motor which can withstand direct exposure to rainwater, snow and can even be washed off with a garden hose. Both industrial and residential fans come in dry-rated as well as damp and wet-rated varieties.

== Types ==
Many styles of ceiling fans have been developed over the years in response to several different factors such as growing energy-consumption consciousness and changes in decorating styles. The advent and evolution of new technologies have also played a major role in ceiling fan development. Following is a list of major ceiling fan styles and their defining characteristics:

- Cast-iron ceiling fans. These account for almost all ceiling fans made since their invention in 1882 through the mid-1960s. A cast-iron housing encases a very heavy-duty motor, usually of the shaded-pole variety. These motors are lubricated by means of a thrust bearing submerged in an oil-bath and must be oiled periodically, usually once or twice per year. Because these fans are so sturdily built, and due to their utter lack of electronic components, it is not uncommon to see cast-iron fans aged eighty years or more running strong and still in use today.

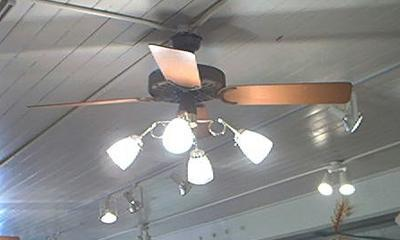
A cast-iron ceiling fan made by Hunter, dating from the early 1980s. This model is called the "Original".

  - The Hunter 'Original' (manufactured by the Hunter Fan Co.) is by far the most recognizable example of a cast-iron ceiling fan today. It has enjoyed the longest production run of any fan in history, dating from 1906 to the present day. The Hunter Original employed a shaded-pole motor from its inception until 1984 (the 91.44 cm Original remained shaded pole before it was replaced with the 106.68 cm Original in 1985), at which point it was changed to a much more efficient permanent split-capacitor motor. Though the fan's physical appearance remains virtually unchanged, the motor was downgraded in 2002 when production was shipped to Taiwan; the motor, though still oil-lubricated, was switched to a "skeletal" design, as discussed below, with a shortened main shaft that inadvertently caused reliability issues. In 2015, this motor design was revised, and once again employs a full-length main shaft; the key element to the longevity of the pre-2002 motors.

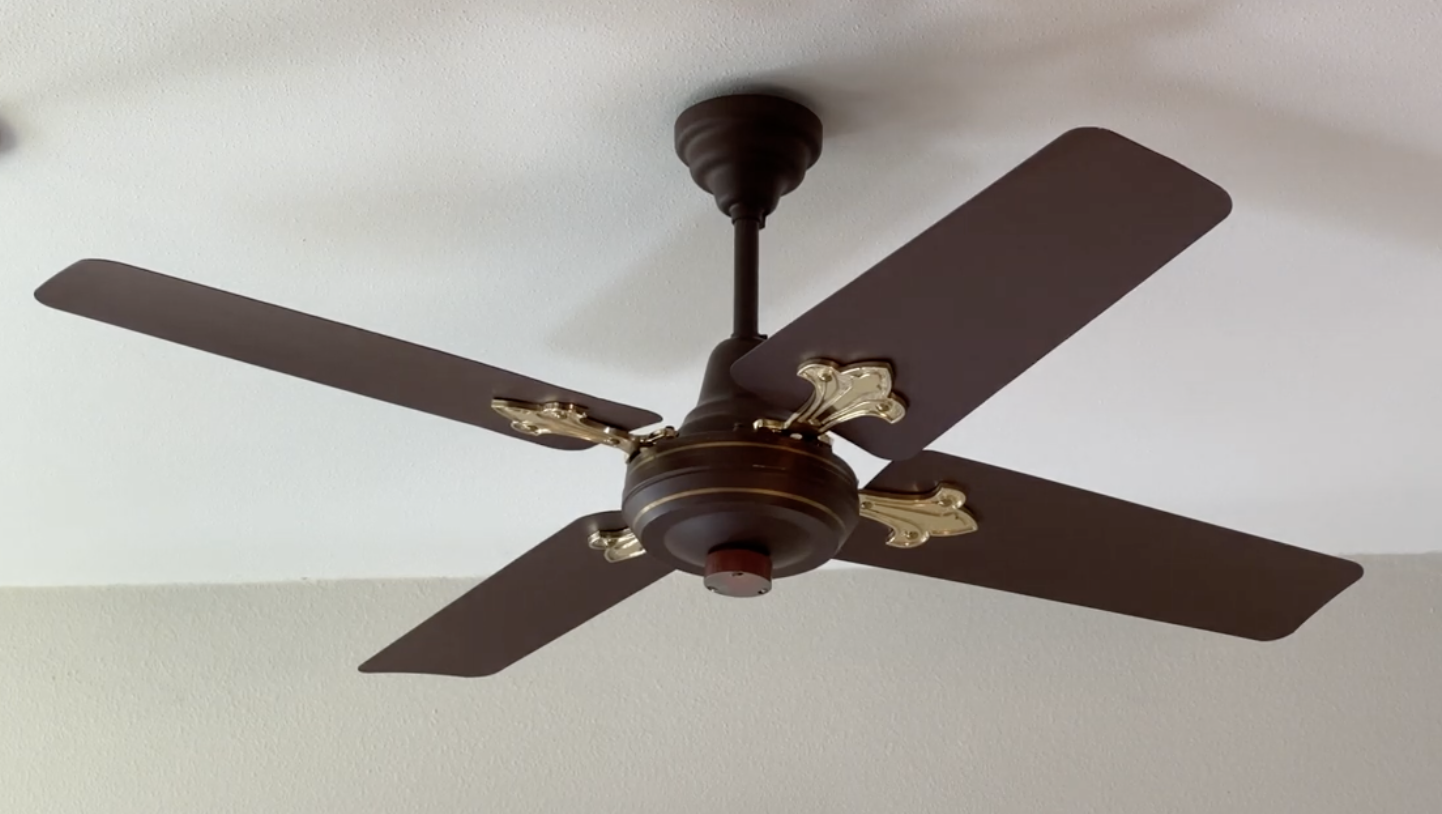
The highly efficient Encon 20 pole "Pancake" motor design, manufactured by Crompton-Greaves in Bombay, India, dating from the mid 1970s. This model is called the "Encon Deco".

- 20 pole Induction "Pancake" motor ceiling fans. These fans with highly efficient cast aluminum housings, were invented in 1957 by Crompton-Greaves, Ltd of India and were first imported into the United States in 1973 by Encon Industries. This Crompton-Greaves motor was developed through a joint venture with Crompton-Parkinson of England and took 20 years to perfect. It is considered the most energy-efficient motor ever manufactured for ceiling fans (apart from the DC motor) since it consumes less energy than a household incandescent light bulb.

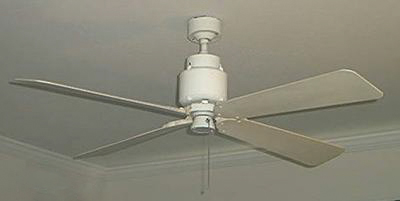
The Emerson "Heat Fan", the first ceiling fan to use a stack motor

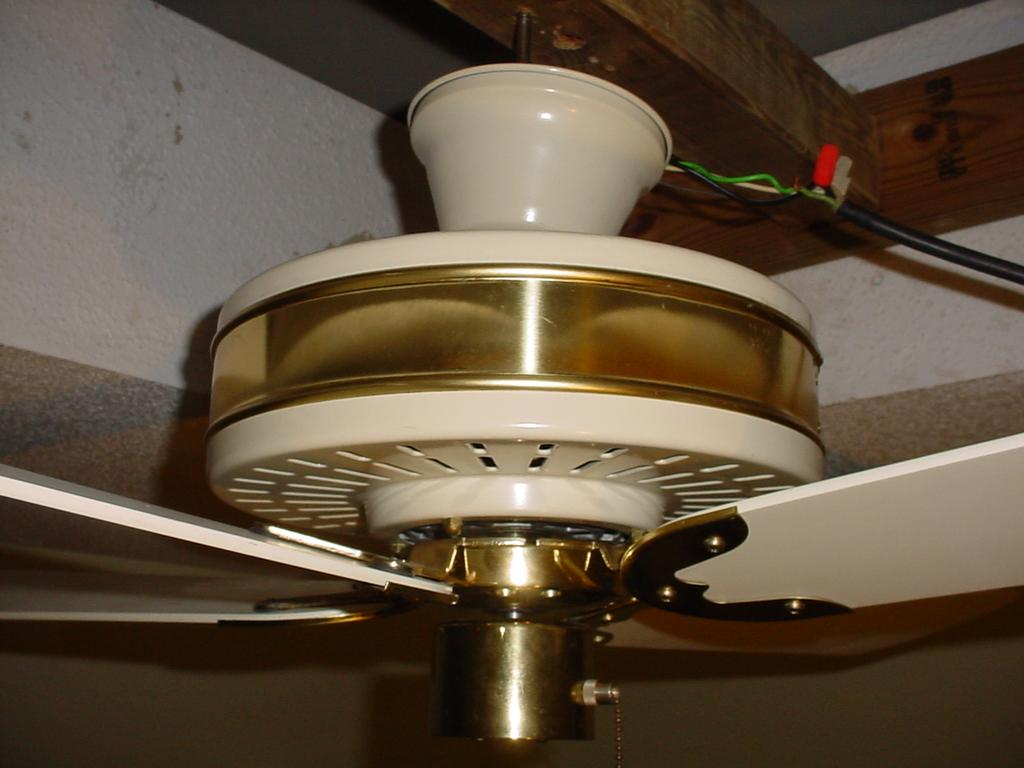
A close-up of the dropped flywheel on a FASCO "Charleston" ceiling fan

- Stack-motor ceiling fans. In the late 1970s, due to rising energy costs prompted by the energy crisis, Emerson adapted their "K63" motor, commonly used in household appliances and industrial machinery, to be used in ceiling fans. This new "stack" motor, along with Encon's cast aluminum 20 pole motor, proved to be powerful, yet energy-efficient, and aided in the comeback of ceiling fans in America, since it was far less expensive to operate than air conditioning. With this design (which consists of a basic stator and rotor), the fan's blades mount to a central hub, known as a flywheel. The flywheel which is made of either metal or reinforced rubber can be mounted either flush with the fan's motor housing (concealed) or prominently below the fan's motor housing (known as a "dropped flywheel"). Many manufacturers develop and use their own stack motors, including (but not limited to) Casablanca, Emerson, FASCO, Hunter, and NuTone. Some manufacturers trademarked their personal incarnation of this motor: for example, Emerson's "K63" and later "K55" motors, Fanimation's "FDK-2100", and Casablanca's "XLP-2000" and "XLP-2100". The earliest stack-motor fan was the Emerson, which was an earlier version of the model that was later called "Heat-Fan", a utilitarian fan with a dropped metal flywheel and blades made of fiberglass and later moulded plastic depending on the model. This fan was produced in numerous different forms from 1962 through 2005 and, while targeted at commercial settings, also found great success in residential settings. Casablanca Fan Co. also made stack-motor fans with concealed flywheels rather than dropped flywheels. While this motor is not nearly as widely used as in the 1970s and 1980s, it can still be found in Razzetii Italy brand. One disadvantage of this type of fan is that the flywheel, if it is made from rubber, will dry out and crack over time and eventually break; this is usually not dangerous, but it renders the fan inoperable until the flywheel is replaced.

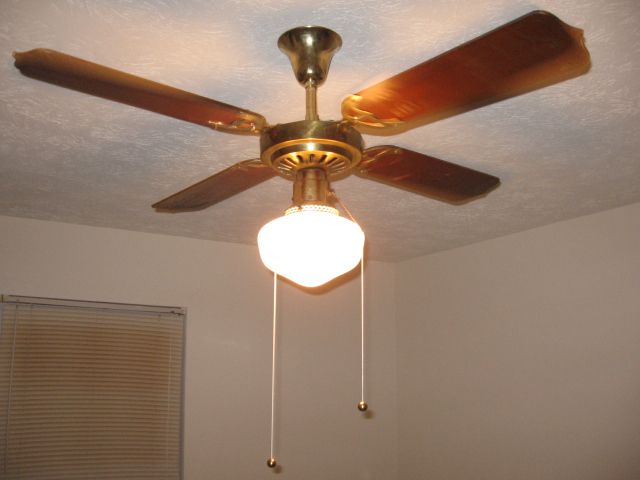
A spinner fan with light kit

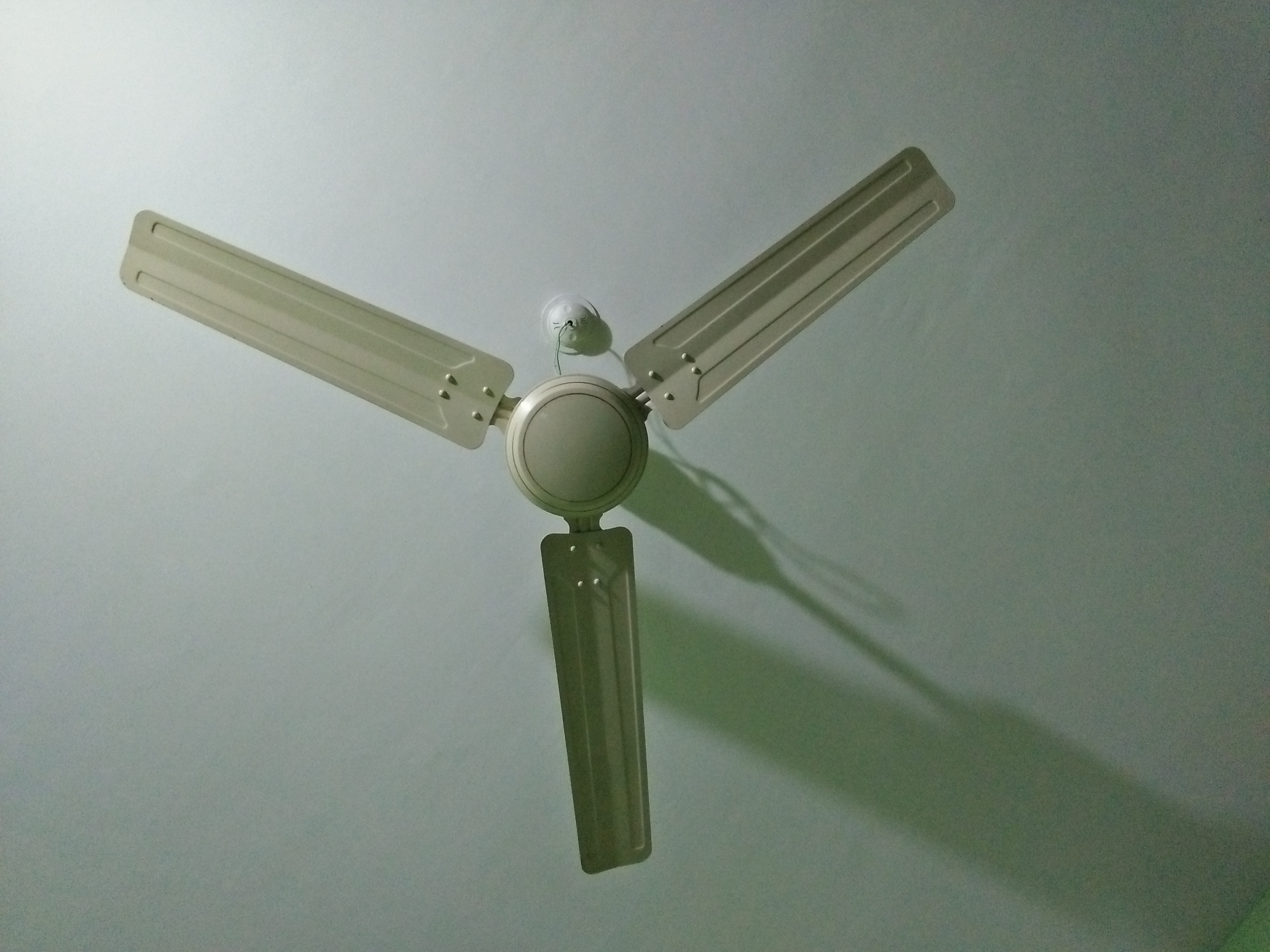
A modern three blade spinner fan from India

- Direct-drive ceiling fans employ a motor with a stationary inner core with a shell, made of cast iron, cast aluminum, or stamped steel, that revolves around it (commonly called a "spinner" motor). The blades are attached directly to this shell. Direct-drive motors are the least expensive motors to produce, and on the whole are the most prone to failure and noise generation. While the very first motors of this type (first used in the 1960s) were relatively heavy-duty, the quality of these motors has dropped significantly in recent years. This type of motor has become the de facto standard for today's fans; it is used in all Hampton Bay and Harbor Breeze ceiling fans sold today, and has commonly been used by most other brands.
  - Spinner-motor fans, sometimes incorrectly referred to as "spinners", employ a direct-drive (spinner) motor and do have a stationary decorative cover (motor housing). "Spinner-motor" fans account for nearly all fans manufactured from the late 1980s to the present.
  - Spinner fans employ a direct-drive motor and do not have a stationary decorative cover (motor housing). This accounts for most industrial-style fans (though such fans sometimes have more moderate-quality motors), and inexpensive residential fans commonly found in Brazil, South Asia, Southeast Asia and many Middle Eastern countries.
- Skeletal motors, which are a high-end subset of direct-drive motors, can be found on some higher-quality fans. Examples of skeletal motors include Hunter's "AirMax" motor, Casablanca's "XTR200" motor, and the motors made by Sanyo for use in ceiling fans sold under the Lasko name, and post-2002 Hunter "Original" ceiling fans. Skeletal motors differ from regular direct-drive motors in that:
  - They have an open-frame ("skeletal") design, which allows for far better ventilation and therefore a longer lifespan. This is in comparison to a regular direct-drive motor's design, in which the motor's inner workings are completely enclosed within a tight metal shell which may or may not have openings for ventilation; even when openings are present, they are almost always small to the point of being inadequate.
  - These are typically larger than regular direct-drive motors and, as a result, are more powerful and less prone to burning out.
- Friction-drive ceiling fans. This short-lived type of ceiling fan was attempted by companies such as Emerson and NuTone in the late 1970s with little success. Its advantage was its tremendously low power consumption, but the fans were unreliable and very noisy, in addition to being grievously under-powered. Friction-drive ceiling fans employ a low-torque motor that is mounted transversely in relation to the flywheel. A rubber wheel mounted on the end of the motor's shaft drove a hub (via contact friction, hence the name) which, in turn, drove the flywheel. It was a system based on the fact that a low-torque motor spinning quickly can drive a large, heavy device at a slow speed without great energy consumption (see Gear ratio).
- Gear-drive ceiling fans. These were similar to (and even less common than) the friction drive models; however, instead of a rubber wheel on the motor shaft using friction to turn the flywheel, a toothed gear on the end of the motor shaft meshed with gear teeth formed into the flywheel, thus rotating it. The company "Panama" made gear driven ceiling fans and sold them exclusively through the "Family Handyman" magazine in the 1980s, and some HVLS ceiling fans have a gearbox motor.
- Internal belt-drive ceiling fans. These were also similar in design to gear-drive and friction-drive fans; however, instead of a rubber friction wheel or toothed gear, a small rubber belt linked the motor to the flywheel. The most notable internal belt-drive ceiling fans were the earliest models produced by the Casablanca Fan Co. and a model sold by Toastmaster.

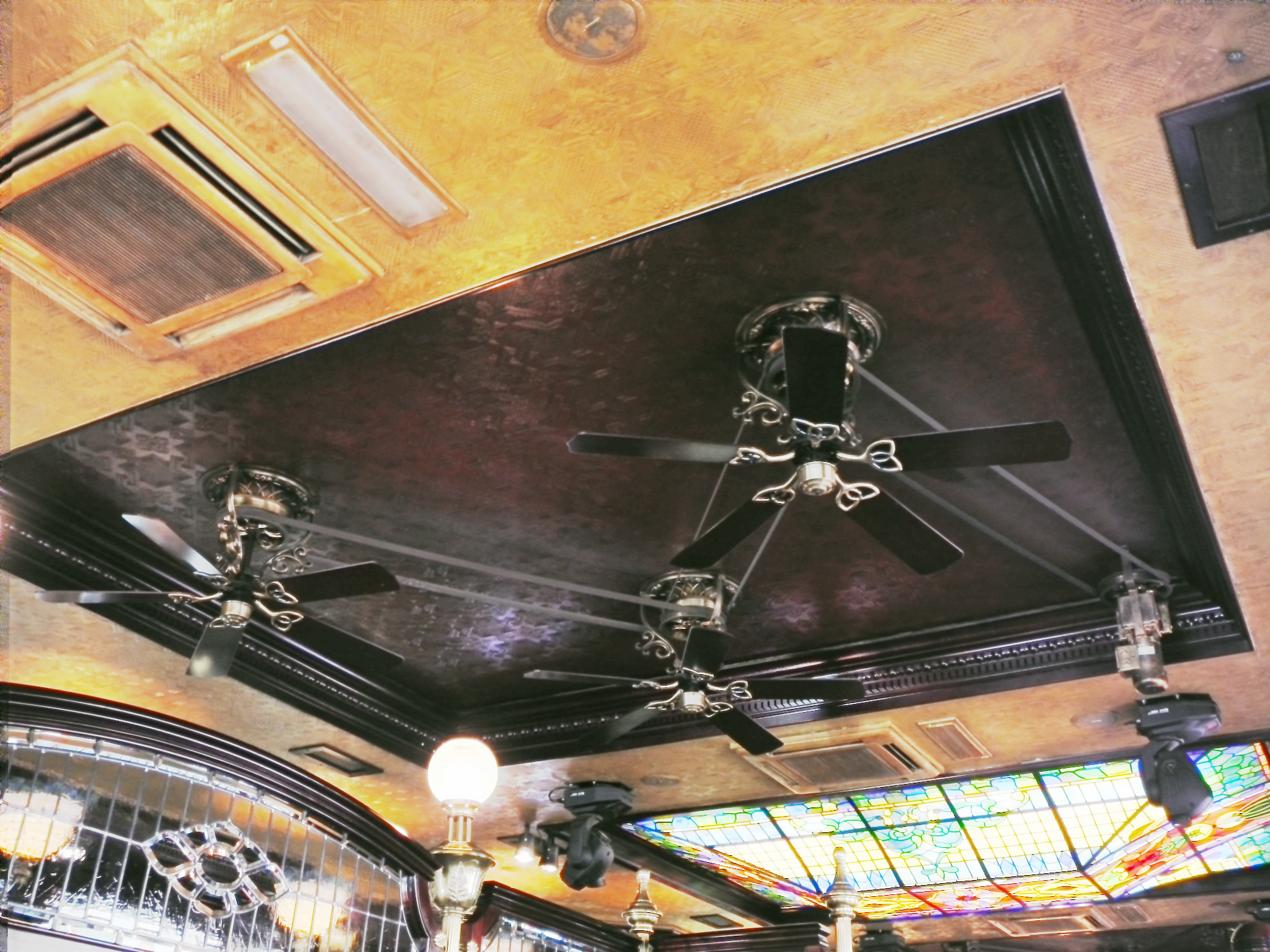
Three fans driven by a single motor and belts

- Belt-driven ceiling fans. As stated earlier in this article, the first ceiling fans used a water-powered system of belts to turn the blades of fan units (which consisted of nothing more than blades mounted on a flywheel). For period-themed decor, a few companies (notably Fanimation and Woolen Mill) have created reproduction belt-drive fan systems. The reproduction systems feature an electric motor as the driving force, in place of the water-powered motor.

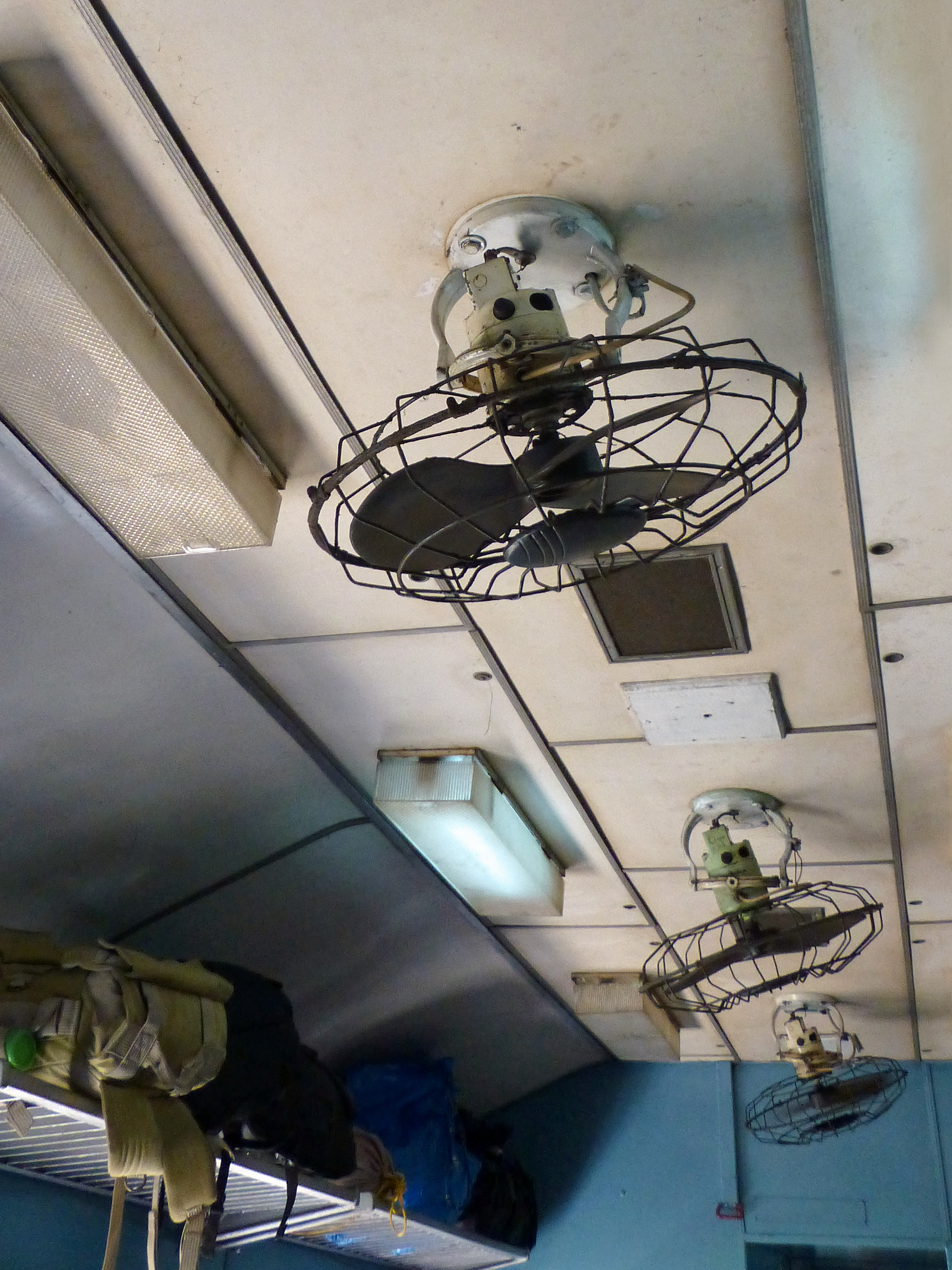
Orbit fans inside a train in Sri Lanka

- Orbit fans use a mechanism to oscillate 360 degrees. They are also typically flushed to the ceiling like hugger type fans. They are also very small in size, usually, about 40.64 cm and have a similar construction to that of many pedestal fans and desk fans, and usually have finger guards. These are once again, popular mostly in many developing countries as they are a cheap alternative to traditional paddle type ceiling fans. Many American manufacturers, such as "Fanimation" have started producing high quality designer versions of such fans.
- Mini ceiling fans are mostly found in less developed places, such as the Philippines and Indonesia, and today are constructed similarly to most oscillating pedestal and table fans, predominantly out of plastic. These fans, hence the name "mini" ceiling fan are relatively small in size, usually ranging from 40.64 cm to 91.44 cm, however, some still span to sizes as large as 106.68 cm in diameter. Additionally, unlike traditional ceiling fans, these fans typically use synchronous motors.
- Bladeless ceiling fans. This type was introduced in 2012 by Exhale fans and uses a bladeless turbine to push air outwards from the fan, which is also the case of regular ceiling fans on updraft mode. These fans feature a brushless DC motor instead of a normal direct-drive motor.
- A pendulum fan or flap fan is a type of low velocity ceiling fan that can be used for air circulation around a targeted area. The back and forth motion increases turbulence around cooling sources, like chilled waterfalls at the Lavin Bernick Center at Tulane, helping to cool a greater volume of air.
- Brushed DC ceiling fans. Before the current switched from DC to AC, there were productions of brushed DC ceiling fans. Those are wired directly to DC wires.
- Brushless DC ceiling fans. This type of fans uses BLDC technology which offers much higher efficiency than normal fans driven with traditional AC motors. These are quieter than AC motor fans due to the fact that they are commutated electronically and use permanent magnet rotors. Among the other advantages, these fans offer are high efficiency, lower noise level, less rotor heat, integration of remote control and other convenience technologies etc.

In India, Versa Drives’ Superfan was described by The Times of India as the country’s first energy-efficient ceiling fan (2012); it uses a brushless DC (BLDC) motor. The only drawbacks are the high cost and the presence of complex electronics which may be more prone to failure and difficult to service. However, with the advent of new technologies and better quality control techniques, the latter is becoming less of a concern. Those are wired to AC wires along with AC/DC adaptor.

- Smart ceiling fans. These fans can be controlled by Google Assistant, Amazon Alexa Assistant, Apple Homekit and Wifi. A vast majority of these fans use BLDC motors due to their microcontroller based design, flexibility in fine controls and firmware upgrade capability. The speed, brightness and timing of the fans can be adjusted with a smartphone app.

== Effects on airborne transmission and distribution ==
Ceiling fans provide a more affordable and energy-efficient alternative to air-conditioning, especially when used in conjunction with warmer room air temperature. Overall, the use of ceiling fans results in a lesser impact on global warming when looking at carbon generation suppression. In addition to improving thermal comfort and reducing energy consumption from air-conditioning, ceiling fans have also been studied as a tool that could potentially affect airborne transmission and distribution of infection.

Ceiling fans affect the air and pollutant distribution in a space, including infectious aerosols. Ceiling fans may decrease the risk of transmission of infectious aerosols.

An experiment using gas to simulate exhaled droplet nuclei found that ceiling fans could reduce the concentration of aerosols at the exposed person's breathing zone by more than 20%. Ceiling fans were proven to have a more significant effect on the droplet and airborne transmission when the coughing infected person is located directly under the ceiling fan. Ceiling fans offer better protection from cough exposure for people located closer to the fan center, where the directed airflow changing particle trajectory downward to the floor is the greatest.

A more realistic experiment using tracer particles found ceiling fans are effective in reducing the infection risks by 47% in short-range, but marginally increase infections risks in long-range transmissions. The benefits of ceiling fans are highest when the room is well ventilated, when masking measures are in place, and when the pathogen is not highly contagious. However if there are more people at long range distances, ceiling fans may cause more people to get sick by dispersing exhaled pathogens that are highly contagious, like measles and the SARS-CoV-2 Omicron variant, even if the room follows the ASHRAE 241 recommendations.

== Safety concerns with installation ==
A typical ceiling fan weighs between 3.6 and 22.7 kg when fully assembled. While many junction boxes can support that weight while the fan is hanging still, a fan in operation exerts many additional stresses—notably torsion—on the object from which it is hung; this can cause an improper junction box to fail. For this reason, in the United States the National Electrical Code (document NFPA 70, Article 314) states that ceiling fans must be supported by an electrical junction box listed for that use. It is a common mistake for homeowners to replace a light fixture with a ceiling fan without upgrading to a proper junction box. Ultimately, the weight of the fan must be carried by a strong structural element of the ceiling, such as a ceiling joist. Should an improperly mounted fan fall, especially a 22.7 kg cast iron fan, the result could be catastrophic.

=== Low-hanging fans/danger to limbs ===
Another concern with installing a ceiling fan relates to the height of the blades relative to the floor. Building codes throughout the United States prohibit residential ceiling fans from being mounted with the blades closer than seven feet from the floor; this sometimes proves, however, to not be high enough. If a ceiling fan is turned on and a person fully extends his or her arms into the air, as sometimes happens during normal tasks such as dressing, stretching or changing bedsheets, it is possible for the blades to strike their hands, potentially causing injury. Also, if one is carrying a long and awkward object, one end may inadvertently enter the path of rotation of a ceiling fan's blades, which can cause damage to the fan. Building codes throughout the United States also prohibit industrial ceiling fans from being mounted with the blades closer than 10 feet from the floor for these reasons.

In other countries, ceiling fans usually come with a warning to install the fan so that the blades are 2.3 meters above the floor or higher, as instructed by the IEC and similar bodies. This rule applies to all "high level fans" including but not limited to ceiling fans.

In Australia, building codes require fans to be mounted at least 2.1 meters high.

==== MythBusters: "Killer Ceiling Fan" ====
In 2004, MythBusters tested the idea that a ceiling fan is capable of decapitation if an individual was to stick his or her neck into a running fan. Two versions of the myth were tested, with the first being the "jumping kid", involving a kid jumping up and down on a bed, jumping too high and entering the fan from below and the second being the "lover's leap", involving a husband leaping towards his bed and entering the fan side-on. Kari Byron and Scottie Chapman purchased a regular household fan and also an industrial fan, which has metal blades as opposed to wood and a more powerful motor. They busted the myth in both scenarios with both household and industrial fans, as tests proved that residential ceiling fans are, apparently by design, largely incapable of causing more than a minor injury, having low-torque motors that stop quickly when blocked and blades composed of light materials that tend to break easily if impacted at speed (the household fan test of the "lover's leap" scenario actually broke the fan blades.) They did find that industrial fans, with their steel blades and higher speeds, proved capable of causing injury and laceration—building codes require industrial fans to be mounted with blades 3.048 m above the floor, and the industrial fan test of the "lover's leap" scenario produced a lethal injury where the fan sliced through the jugular and into the vertebrae—but still lost energy rapidly once blocked and were unable to decapitate the test dummy.

=== Wobble ===
Wobbling is usually caused by the weight of fan blades being out of balance with each other. This can happen due to a variety of factors, including blades being warped, blade irons being bent, blades or blade irons not being screwed on straight, or weight variation between blades. Also, if all the blades do not exert an equal force on the air (because they have different angles, for instance), the vertical reaction forces can cause wobbling. Wobble can also be caused by a motor flaw, but that very rarely occurs. Wobbling is not affected by the way in which the fan is mounted or the mounting surface.

Contrary to popular misconception, wobbling alone will not cause a ceiling fan to fall. Ceiling fans are secured by clevis pins locked with either split pins or R-clips, so wobbling will not have an effect on the fan's security, unless of course, the pins/clips were not secured. To date, there are no reports of a fan wobbling itself off the ceiling and falling. However, a severe wobble can cause light fixture shades or covers to gradually loosen over time and potentially fall, posing a risk of injury to anyone under the fan, and also from any resulting broken glass. When the MythBusters were designing a fan with the goal of chopping off someone's head, Scottie used an edge finder to find the exact center of their blades with the aim of eliminating potentially very dangerous wobbling of their steel blades.

Wobbling may be reduced by measuring the tip of each blade from a fixed point on the ceiling (or floor) and ensuring each is equal. If the fan has a metal plate between the motor and blade, this may be gently adjusted by bending. It can also be reduced by making sure all blades have the same pitch, and all blades have the same distance from adjacent blades. It can also be reduced by having balancing weight on the blades.

Even a very slight wobble can also cause a pull chain to swing, if fan is at right RPM, and as the pull chain swings, it can weaken the part that flexes, which can eventually cause it to break, meaning that a pull chain can fall on someone.

Wobble in some case can cause wires inside the motor to wriggle, and then eventually reach the top of the motor, which can then yank the wires out of the windings. That is fixable, but it may not be very easy to fix.

=== Humming ===
Humming is often caused by using a dimmer switch or a solid state speed control (those are usually made for industrial setting where humming noise is acceptable) to control the fan speed, since those controls cause chopping current, which causes windings to vibrate. Humming can also be caused by a bad start/run capacitor, or a capacitor with a wrong capacitance size for the motor. A bad or wrong start/run capacitor causes the winding current phase on main windings and auxiliary windings to not sync properly and can cause a hum. Also, humming may be reduced by having windings varnished.

== See also ==
- Attic fan
- Whole-house fan
- Window fan
- Air cooler
- Fan death
- Punkah
