= Rezek =

Rezek (feminine Rezková) is a Czech surname, a reference to person's red hair. Notable people include:

- Antonín Rezek (1853–1909), Czech historian
- Francisco Rezek (born 1944), Brazilian judge
- Jakub Rezek (born 1998), Czech footballer
- Jan Rezek (born 1982), Czech footballer
- Miloslava Rezková (1950–2014), Czech high jumper
- Ron Rezek (born 1946), American entrepreneur
