= Punkah =

Type of fan

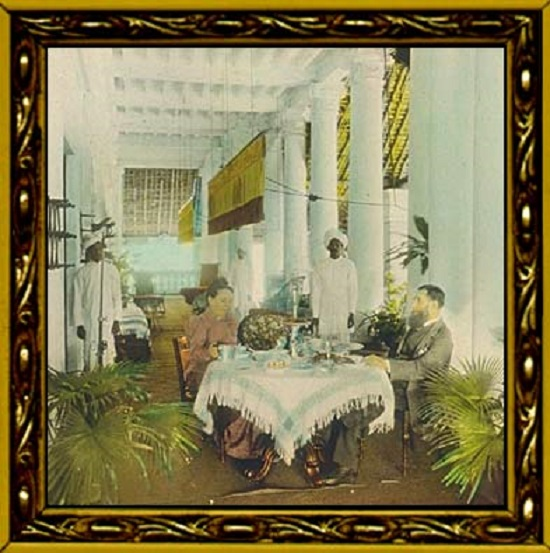
Punkahs in the house of a British couple in India c. 1880

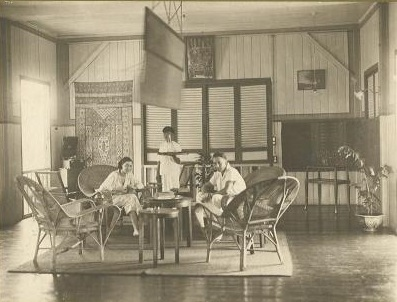
A punkah in the house of French colonials in Indochina c. 1930

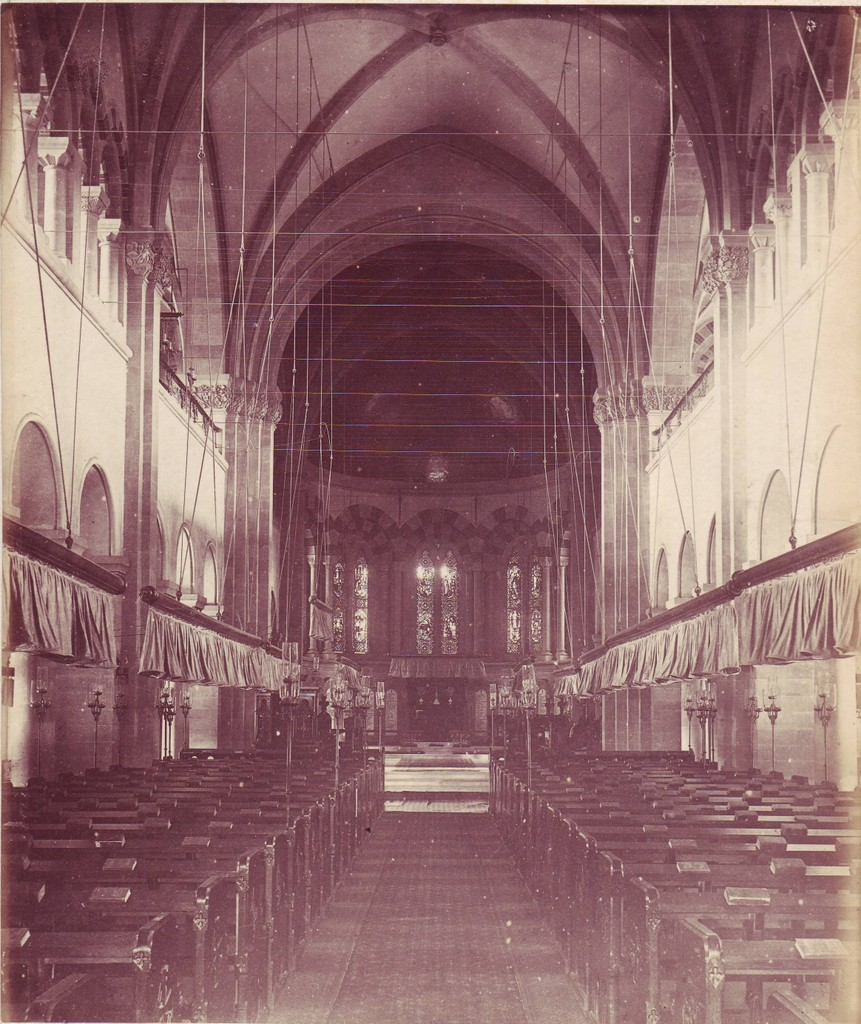
Church interior with an intricate system of punkahs c. 1900

A punkah, also pankha (Urdu: پَنکھا, Hindi: पंखा, paṅkhā), is a type of fan used since the early 6th century BC. The word pankha originated from pankh, the wings of a bird which produce a current of air when flapped.

== History ==
In its original sense in the Indian subcontinent, pankha (a Hindi word) typically describes a handheld fan made from a single frond of palm or a woven square of bamboo strips, rattan or other plant fibre, that can be rotated or fanned. These small handheld devices are still used by millions when ceiling fans stop working during frequent power outages.

In the colonial age, the word came to be used in British India and elsewhere in the tropical and subtropical world for a large swinging fan, fixed to the ceiling, pulled by a punkah wallah during hot weather. To cover a larger area, such as the inside of an office or a courthouse, a number of punkahs could be connected together by strings so that they would swing in unison. The material used could range from utilitarian rattan to expensive fabrics. The date of this invention is not known, but it was familiar to the Arabs as early as the 8th century.

The electric ceiling fan largely supplanted it in barracks and other large buildings at the beginning of the 20th century.

== Legacy ==
The term punkah louvre refers to the directional outlet for cool air in aircraft, particularly those over the passenger seats.

In India, the punkhawallah or pankha wallah was the servant who operated the fan, often using a pulley system.

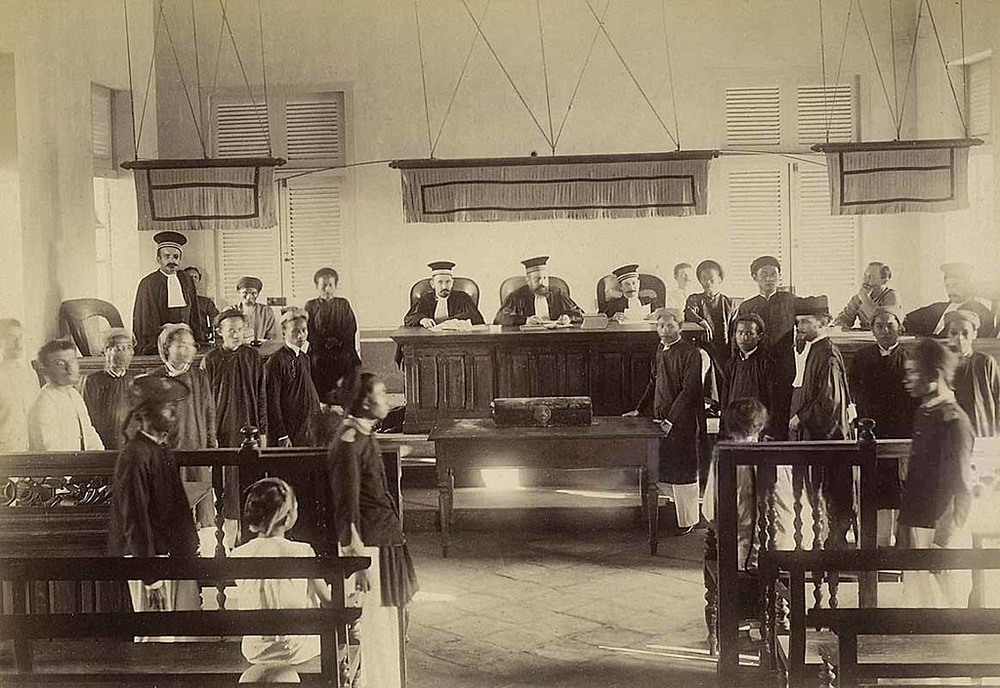
French Indochina courtroom equipped with punkah fans

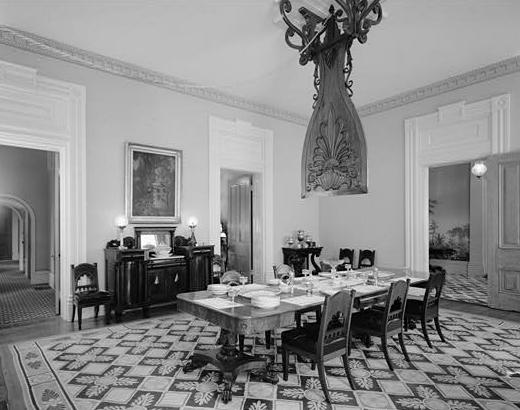
A punkah in an antebellum house in Natchez, Mississippi

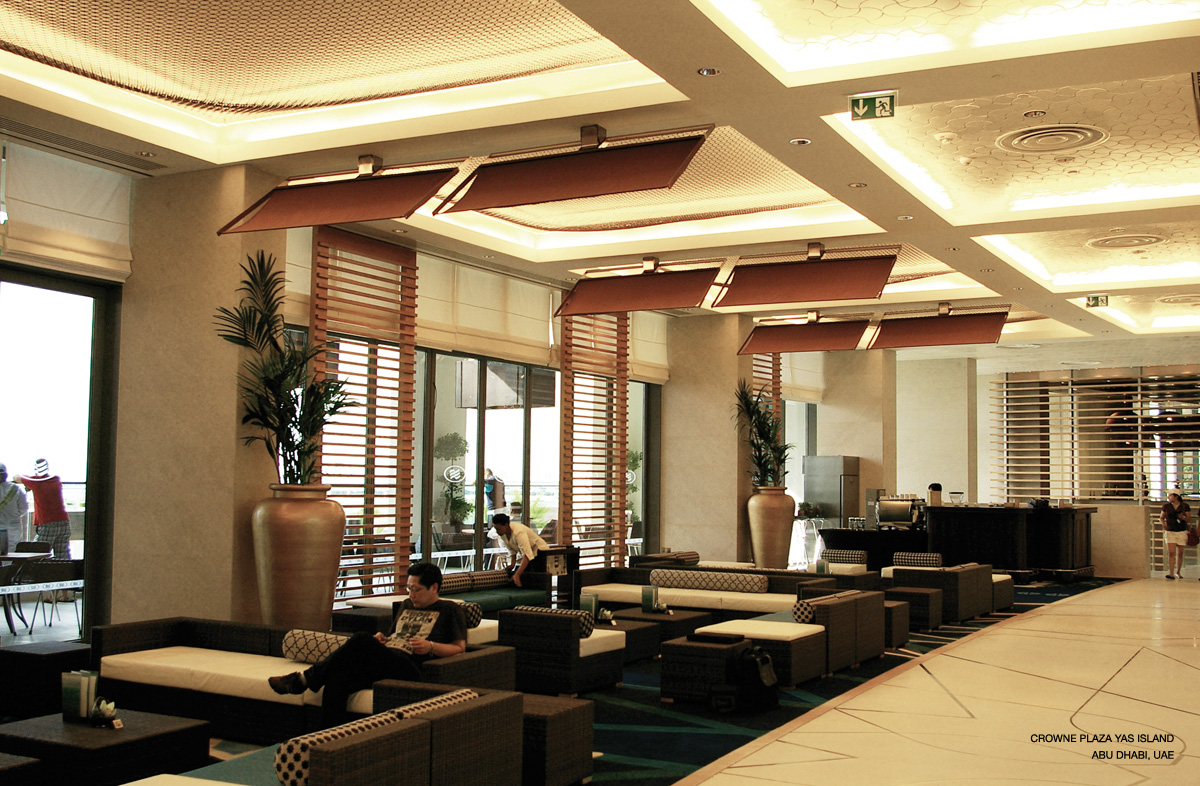
Decorative punkah fans at a hotel in Abu Dhabi (UAE)

== See also ==
- Coolie
- List of obsolete occupations
- Ceiling fan
