= Casablanca Fan Company =

American ceiling fan company

- Current Casablanca Fan Company Logo used since 2007
- Founded: 1974; 52 years ago
- Founder: Burton A. Burton
- Fate: Purchased by Hunter Fan Co. in 1996
- Headquarters: Memphis, Tennessee, United States
- Products: Ceiling fans, Adaptable light kits
- Parent: Hunter Fan Co. (1996-Present) Casablanca Industries, Inc. (1974-1991) General Electric (1991-1996)

Casablanca Fan Company is an American ceiling fan company founded in 1974. It has been a subsidiary of Hunter Fan Company since 1996, and is currently based in Memphis, Tennessee. Casablanca became known in the late 1970s for marketing their premium and luxury ceiling fans as furniture, and Casablanca continues to operate today as Hunter's luxury fan division.

== History ==
Casablanca was founded by Burton A. Burton in Pasadena, California, in 1974. Burton's unique marketing techniques included inviting customers aboard refurbished 1940s railroad cars from the New York Central Railroad and Rock Island Line. By 1980, Casablanca was selling about US$42M in fans per year. To better cope with the seasonal swings of the ceiling fan business, Casablanca purchased Lavery & Co. in 1984, a Van Nuys, California-based manufacturer of consumer lighting fixtures founded by Arthur J. Lavery in the late 1940s.

Following a hiatus, Burton regained presidency of Casablanca in July 1985, and was named chief executive of the parent company, Casablanca Industries Inc. Reporting to Burton was Richard Y. Fisher, who was named president of Casablanca Industries. He served as chairman and president of Milwaukee-based Diana Corp. (formerly Farm House Foods), which previously acquired a 47% stake in Casablanca. In addition, S. John Gorman remained president of Lavery & Co.

Casablanca continue to grow and thrive through the mid-1980s, competing alongside many of the leading competitors at the time, Hunter Fan Company, Homestead, and Emerson Electric. Under leadership from founder and chairman Burton, and their adopted slogan “An Investment in Quality”, Casablanca became the gold standard for ceiling fans, one that other companies had to compete with. By the mid-1990s, Casablanca decided to drop its secondary products, and decided to exclusively manufacture ceiling fans and portable fans, only growing their business model from there, doubling down on their main focus.

On March 7, 1991, Casablanca Industries Inc. filed for Chapter 11 bankruptcy, due to debt from a leveraged buyout and a housing recession. Casablanca had $71.9 million in assets, and $90.7 million in debts when the bankruptcy was filed. Following the filing, the company was acquired by a subsidiary of General Electric in June 1991. This included the sale of Casablanca's entire inventory and the company's manufacturing plants in City of Industry and Los Angeles. The company had 200 employees on staff at this time. Through this time, Casablanca continued to use Emerson K55 motors for most fans, however started supplying Samsung motors as a cost-cutting measure.

In 1993, Casablanca acquired rival ceiling fan manufacturer Homestead Products following a patent infringement lawsuit that weakened the latter company, and began to consolidate its lineup into its new "Airflow by Casablanca" brand. The Airflow name was phased out in the early 2010s.

In August 1993, Casablanca introduced a new tag variant that would be used for all of their models. This change was apparent on many fans produced around this time, when the city of Pasadena and ZIP code stopped being added onto their informational tags on most fans manufactured after July 1993. By November 1993, all models officially converted to the new tag variant.

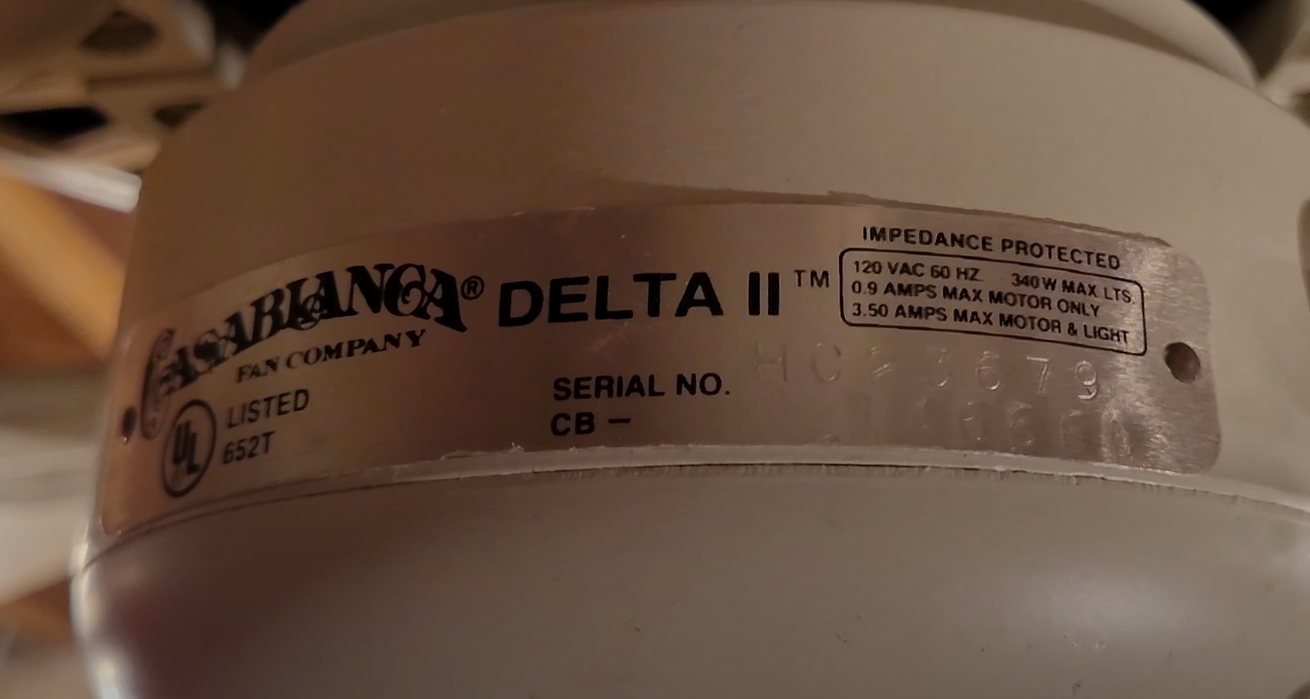
Casablanca Delta II made in August 1993 including the new tag variant, with no reference to the city of Pasadena and standard text for "DELTA II"

In 1996, Casablanca was purchased by Hunter Fan Company, and started shifting manufacturing from their existing California-based plant to Hunter's manufacturing plant in Taiwan. In that same year, Casablanca, now owned by Hunter, decided to ditch their long-standing fixed downrod, and instead opted for a simple screw-in downrod, dubbed Perma-Lock. By 1997, all production of Casablanca fans were successfully moved completely overseas to Taiwan, officially ending the 22-year long tradition of their fans being made and assembled in the USA. The previous motors, supplied by Emerson Electric were replaced by a Casablanca-engineered motor, dubbed the XLP-2000, which was used by Casablanca until 2014. Hunter operated Casablanca as a wholly owned subsidiary until 2010.

In 1997, Casablanca moved from their City of Industry headquarters to their new corporate office in Pomona, California.

In April 2003, Burton A. Burton died at age 75, on Orcas Island.

In 2010, Hunter closed Casablanca's corporate headquarters in Pomona, California, and incorporated Casablanca's corporate operations into their own corporate headquarters in Memphis, Tennessee. Casablanca's main line of ceiling fans were drastically changed in 2013, as part of a major transformation of Hunter's branding and production line. Casablanca currently operates as Hunter Fan Company's luxury fan division.

== Innovations ==
In 1979, Casablanca introduced their Silent-Flex flywheel to replace the milled-aluminum flywheels they had been using prior. The Silent-Flex flywheel was a double-torus made of soft rubber with die-cast zinc reinforcements that acted as a shock absorber to virtually eliminate the transmission of vibration and noise from the fan's motor to the blades.

In 1981, Casablanca introduced the Slumber-Quiet system, which had a 3-way pull chain switch that controlled both the fan motor and an optional light kit, and a variable speed dial to adjust the fan's speed. This system was discontinued in 1985 and replaced with a variation of the system known as Slumber-Five, which had five fixed speeds controlled by a stepped potentiometer rather than a fully variable speed dial. Slumber-Five was discontinued after the 1985 model year.

Also in 1981, Casablanca introduced their Hang-Tru mounting system, which utilized a self-supporting ceiling canopy fastened to the junction box by four long, heavy-duty screws. The fan rested on a ball-and-socket joint and could be mounted on a ceiling angled up to 45 degrees. This number would ultimately be brought down to 32 degrees after multiple design changes and structural modifications.

In 1983, Casablanca introduced the world's first computerized ceiling fan control, called Inteli•Touch. The Inteli•Touch system was marketed as being easy to install, as the fan easily replaced a standard two-wire ceiling-mounted lighting fixture, and the wall control unit replaced a standard two-wire wall toggle switch. The Inteli•Touch control included a PC board mounted inside the fan's switch housing with a small piezo buzzer to emit electronic beeps to verify fan functions, and a wall control, which fed the PC board commands via coded electrical signals through the home's wiring. By 1987, the PC board would be moved to inside the fan's main housing, which would allow a smaller switch housing, and more space inside for light fixtures. The control was innovative because it offered complete control of the fan and light functions independently of each other without the need for additional wiring in the walls of the house, and also for the several programs that could completely automate the ceiling fan, including:

- Light-Minder, which would turn the fan's light kit off two hours after being turned on
- Safe-Exit, which gave the user 30 seconds to exit the room while the fan's light kit gradually dimmed to off
- Fan-Minder, which was intended to be used as the user slept to gradually lower the fan speed as the room temperature fell during the night.
- Home-Safe, which would turn the fan's light kit on and off at random times to make an empty home look occupied.
- Demo Mode, an automatic demonstration/test program, which would cycle the fan and light through all of its various settings.

In 1990, Casablanca introduced their second computerized ceiling fan control, called Comfort•Touch. Comfort•Touch was the first ceiling fan control system to utilize a radio frequency remote transmitter (previous handheld remote systems offered by other manufacturers used infrared transmitters, much like a TV remote.) It was also the first ceiling fan control system to integrate an LCD into the user interface (transmitter). The Comfort•Touch control was handheld, though it included a bracket for mounting to a wall. Comfort•Touch retained all of the settings and programs included with Inteli•Touch, with the exception of Fan-Minder, which was replaced with thermostatic control, allowing for the fan speed to be adjusted automatically corresponding to room temperature, and a "winter mode" was added, which operates the fan at its lowest speed in updraft mode, but with ten-second "bursts" of a higher speed every ten minutes in order to more effectively break up heat stratification at the ceiling with the ceiling fan. Like Inteli•Touch, the system included a PC board inside the fan's housing. In addition to the microcomputer in the fan itself, Comfort•Touch utilized a second microcomputer in the remote transmitter. The system was discontinued in 2002 and replaced by Advan-Touch. The motor housing uses the microcomputer with piezoelectric buzzer to indicates command.

In 1993, the existing W-11 and W-12 Inteli-Touch controls were replaced with the W-31 and W-32 series Inteli-Touch, which included modernized wall control, featuring grey push-button controls rather than the flick switches, the upgrading of the internal PC board, and a new reverse button, which would reverse the fan, rather than the existing method of pressing down the fan and light switches at the same time.

In 2002, Casablanca introduced its third computerized ceiling fan control, called Advan-Touch. Advan-Touch replaced the older Comfort•Touch system, but included a more compact remote design. Like Comfort•Touch, it is a handheld, radio frequency remote control. Advan-Touch retained all of the fan speed and light settings offered in Inteli•Touch and Comfort•Touch, as well as the Safe-Exit and Home-Safe programs. Like Inteli•Touch and Comfort•Touch, the Advan•Touch system included a PC board inside the fan's housing.

In 2003, Casablanca introduced the Advan•Touch Plus control, which combined the features of Advan•Touch and Inteli•Touch2. It incorporates the convenience of the remote control system with an added wall control that replaces an existing light switch.

In 2010, Casablanca introduced the Inteli•Touch3 system, which combined the features of Inteli•Touch and Advan•Touch, similarly to how Advan•Touch Plus combined the features of Advan•Touch and Inteli•Touch 2, albeit using the more familiar layout of the Inteli•Touch W-31 and W-32 wall control. It used radio frequency as its main reception to the fan, and operated through a DIP switch frequency, unlike the original Inteli•Touch, which communicated by sending pulsed electrical signals through the home or building's wiring. This wall control was also joined by a remote control option, making it ideal for homes with direct power to a ceiling junction. These new systems were short-lived, being discontinued in 2014, and replaced with standard wall and remote controls.

== Safety issues and recalls ==
In the early-1990s, a safety recall was issued for Inteli-Touch fans using Samsung motors. An electrical incompatibility between the motor and Inteli-Touch PC board resulted in several reported fires. Following this recall, Casablanca issued replacement Emerson K55 motors to customers who purchased Inteli-Touch fans with Samsung motors.

On 13 December 1993, CPSC and Casablanca’s former parent parent company, General Electric, voluntarily recalled 3,264,000 ceiling fans manufactured from January 1981 through September 1993 after receiving 50 reports of fans falling from their ceiling mountings due to a design flaw in the Hang-Tru canopy. Following this recall, Casablanca redesigned their Hang-Tru mounting system and offered customers who purchased recalled ceiling fans a retrofit part to reduce the risk of their fan falling. Casablanca also offered free installation of this part for no charge on all fans manufactured during or after March 1991.

On 17 December 2015, Hunter Fan Company (now Casablanca's parent company) voluntarily recalled approximately 30,000 fans manufactured in 2013 and 2014 after receiving eight reports of fans unscrewing from their downrods while operating in updraft mode and falling, including one report of minor injury and minor property damage. Hunter urged customers to contact the company for a free in-home inspection and repair following the recall.
