= Perry's Camp =

- U.S. National Register of Historic Places
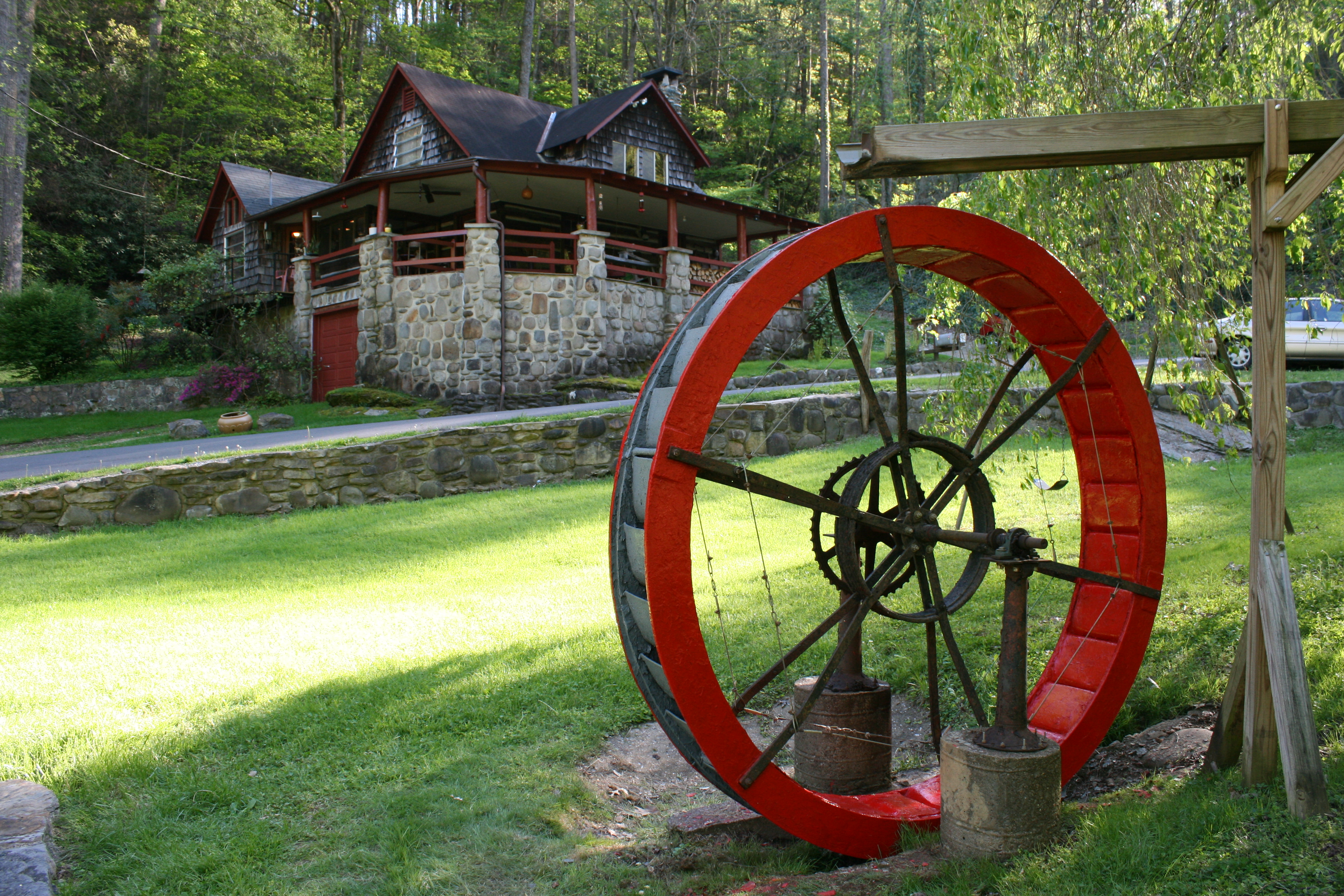
- Water wheel and house of Perry's Camp
- Location: 101 Flat Branch Rd, Sevierville, TN
- Nearest city: Pigeon Forge, Gatlinburg
- Coordinates: 35°43′31″N 83°31′40″W
- Built: 1928
- NRHP reference No.: 92000369
- Added to NRHP: October 30, 1992

Perry's Camp, now known as Flat Branch Cottages, was founded c. 1928 when Charlie Perry developed the site where Flat Branch joins the Little Pigeon River as a tourist resort. Located between Gatlinburg and Pigeon Forge, Tennessee, Perry's Camp was one of the first tourist courts in the area that has since become a tourist mecca. Perry's Camp preceded the founding of the adjacent Great Smoky Mountains National Park by six years. The site originally included a restaurant with living quarters upstairs and eleven cabins, including one log and stone house already on the site from the 1850s.

The site has been owned and operated by the Mack Marshall family since 1952. Three of the remaining four cabins are still rented to tourists April through October.

== Location ==
Perry's Camp was originally located on both sides of the West Fork of the Little Pigeon River about halfway between Gatlinburg and Pigeon Forge where Flat Branch joins the river. The structures closest to the river were demolished when US-441 was widened in the late 1950s. The remaining structures of Perry's Camp are now all located on the west side of the river near the base of Flat Branch road where it joins southbound US-441 adjacent to the middle bridge which spans the northbound and southbound lanes.

== History ==
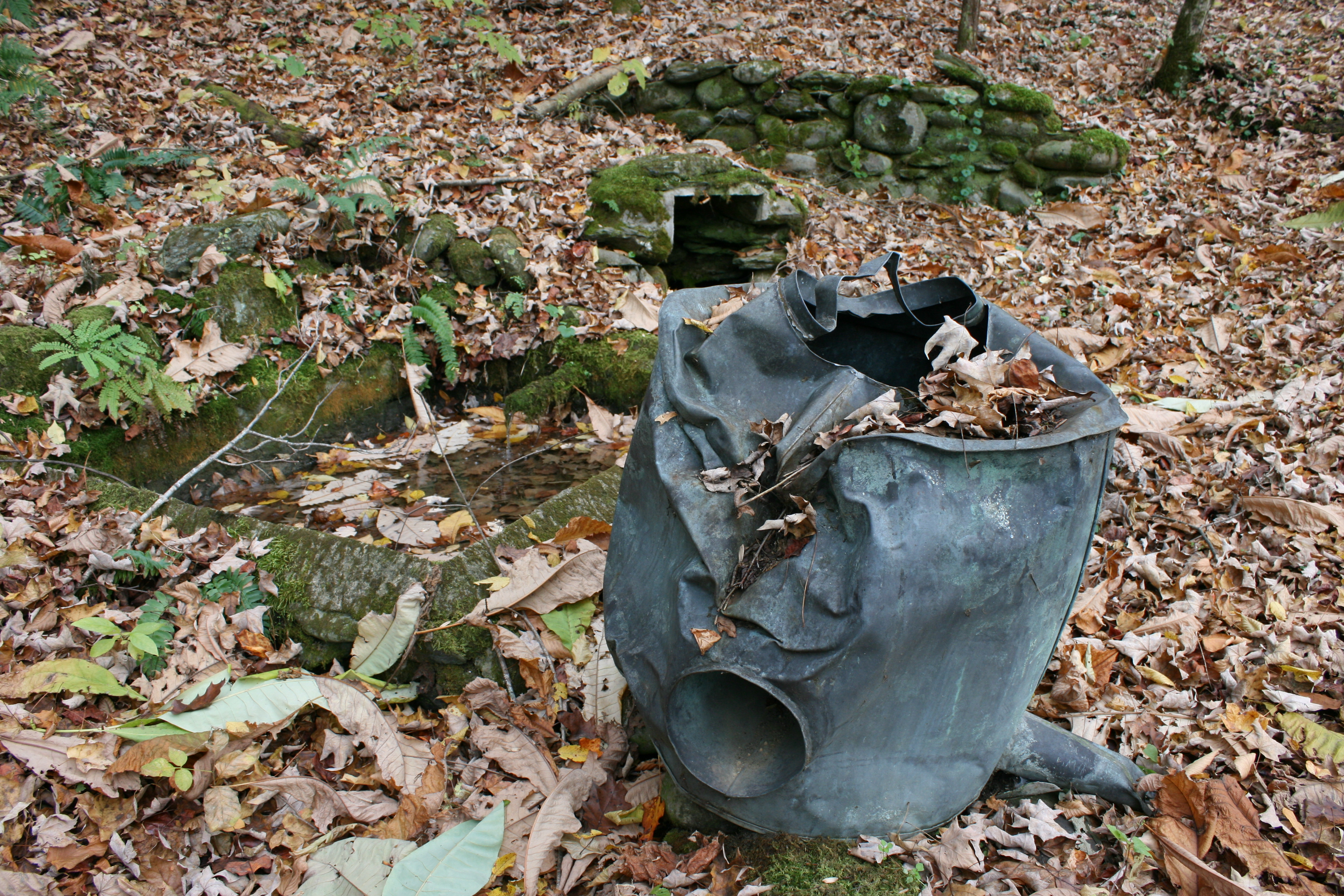
Disabled moonshine still used by Charlie Perry to attract tourists

In c. 1928, Charlie Perry began developing Perry's Camp as a tourist resort, continuing to expand the site over the next twenty years. Perry was very innovative and visionary, and included many interesting artifacts in his development. A dam across the river diverted water through a powerhouse which generated electricity for the resort. A swinging bridge provided the only access to cabins on the east side of the river. A disabled moonshine still hung outside the restaurant for advertisement. A water wheel turned a fan in the dining room. A hollowed-out log covered with glass and filled with water and fish served as a bar in the restaurant. A garage dug into the side of a hill housed Perry's car. Many rock walls were constructed, including a two-level terraced rock wall and rock walls for containing a section of Flat Branch.

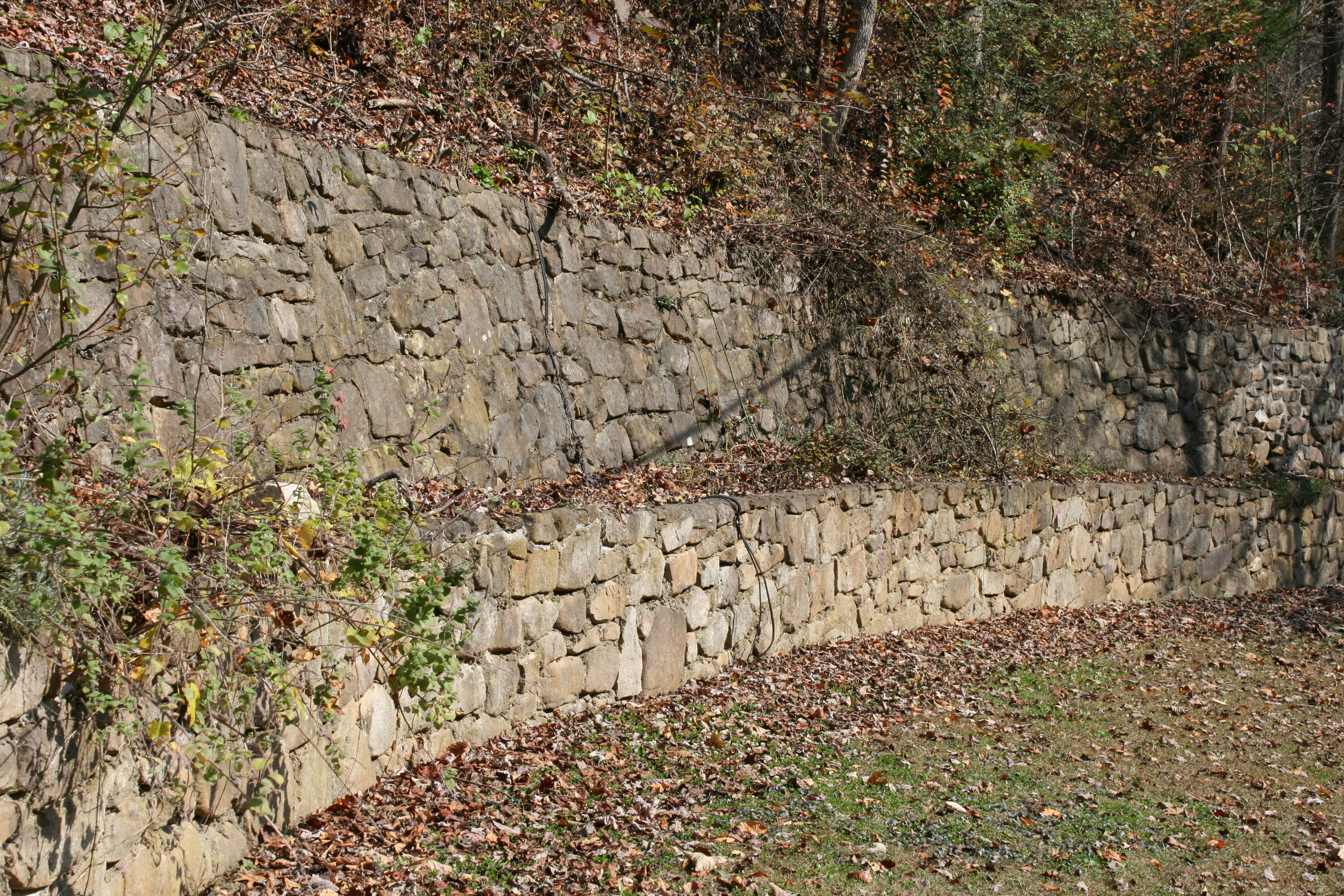
A portion of the two-level terraced rock wall built by Charlie Perry

In 1949, Charlie Perry and his common-law wife Josie Law were brutally murdered and robbed in the restaurant of Perry's Camp as documented in the book "The Perry's Camp Murders" by R.S. Allen with Steve O. Watson, published in August, 2009.

In 1950, following the settlement of the estate, Sevierville businessman Cliff Davis purchased the property and operated it for a couple of years, converting the restaurant into a gift shop. In 1952, the property was purchased by Mack and Agnes Marshall who reopened the restaurant and continued to rent the cabins. Prompted by the ever-increasing tourist traffic to the national park, US 441 was improved and widened in the late 1950s, taking with it the restaurant building, the dam, the swinging bridge, and the six cabins nearest the river.

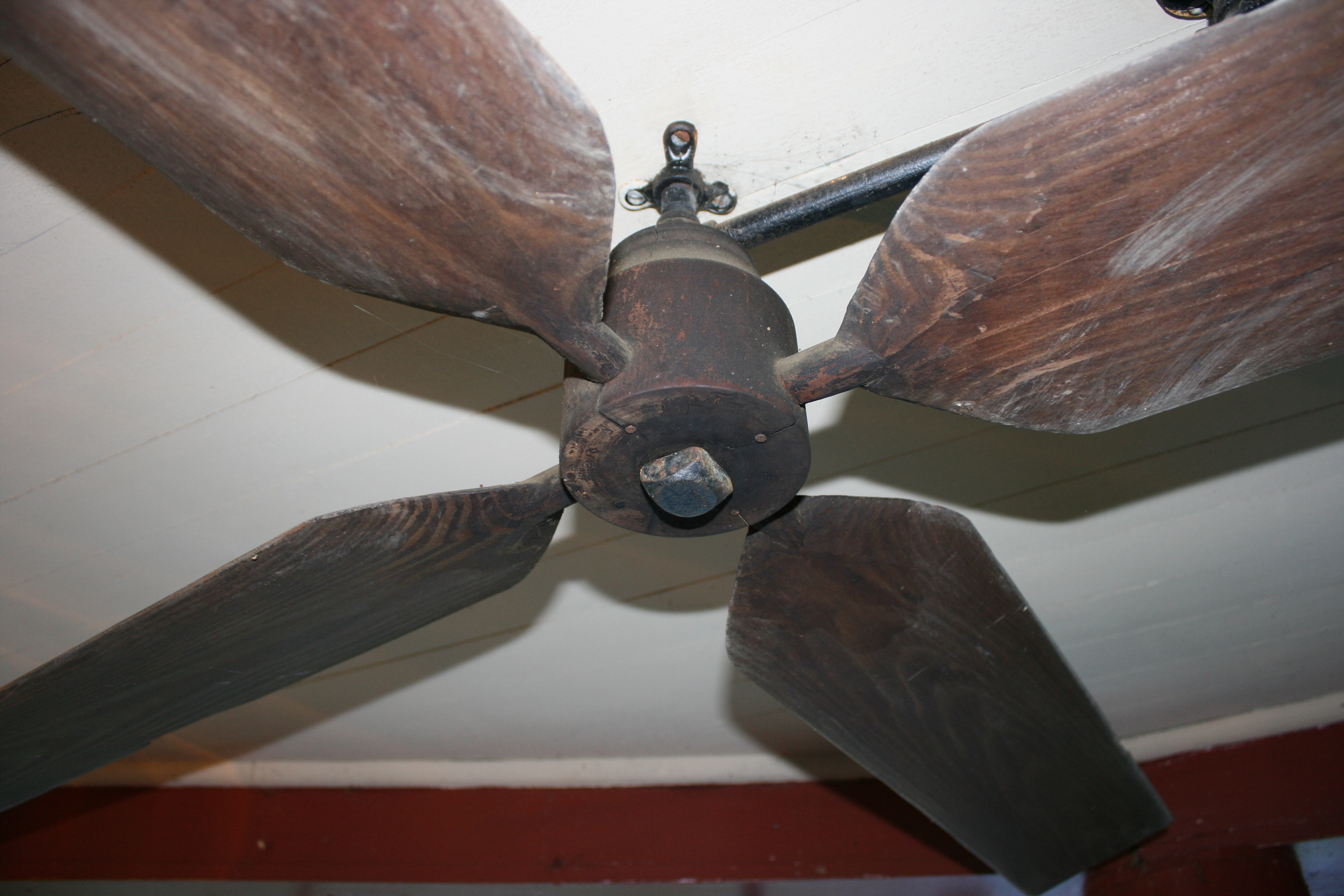
Ceiling fan formerly in dining room of the house at Perry's Camp

At that time, the wormy chestnut wood from the restaurant walls was salvaged and used for the ceiling in the log house, the ceiling fan was placed on the porch of the log house, and the water wheel was moved from behind the restaurant up the hill to its current location. The water wheel was restored c. 1955 using red-painted plywood sides and aluminum buckets, and it was restored again in October 2012 with more historically accurate white oak sides and buckets.

Perry's camp was one of the first tourist sites in East Tennessee and one of very few which has retained much of its construction originality in the four cabins and log house which still exist. As a result, Perry's Camp was entered on the National Register of Historic Places on October 30, 1992. The listing includes the terracing, rock walls, four cabins, and log house. The site is now named Flat Branch Cottages, and three of the four cabins are still rented to tourists April through October. The site has been owned and operated by the Mack Marshall family since 1952.

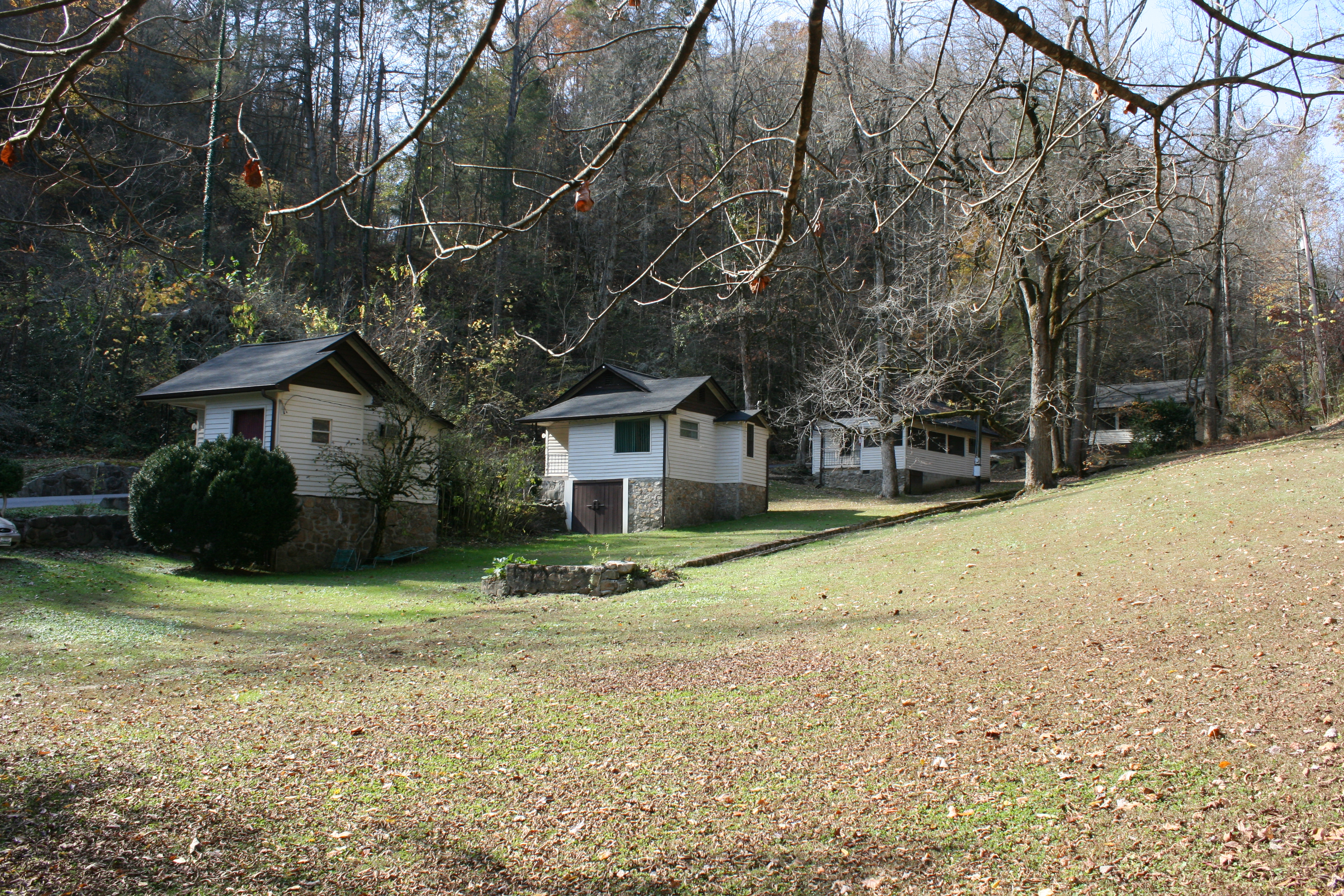
Flat Branch Cottages
