= Ron Rezek =

Industrial Designer Ron Rezek in 2009

Ronald John Rezek (born October 31, 1946) is a design entrepreneur who started five successful companies and has designed hundreds of contemporary light fixtures and ceiling fans. He is an expert on design patents and copyrights, and is often used as an expert witness in court.

He earned his bachelor's degree in Industrial Design and a Master's in Fine Arts in Industrial Design at UCLA. There, his professors included designers Henry Dreyfuss, Charles Eames, Neils Different and Don Chadwick. In 1970, while still in graduate school, he designed an innovative lifeguard rescue device that is still being used today and he founded Surf-Saving International to manufacture and sell the device. In 1978, he started Ron Rezek Lighting in Culver City, CA, which he sold in 2004 but which continues to design original decorative light fixtures. In 1988, he designed the first contemporary-styled ceiling fan, which "quickly became popular in both commercial and residential settings," noted the New York Times. Later, he began the niche company, The Modern Fan Co., which is the only U.S. company to design and sell only contemporary ceiling fans. In 2008, he designed a line of ceiling fans inspired by American and European design movements of the 20th century and launched a new company, The Period Arts Fan Co.

== Career ==
Ron Rezek's career began in 1970 while he was a graduate student at UCLA working on an MFA degree, studying industrial design and working as a teaching assistant. While experimenting with rotational molding of plastic, in particular cross-linking orange polyethylene to produce an extremely tough and seamless plastic vessel, he was approached by a Los Angeles county lifeguard to investigate an alternative for the spun aluminum rescue can. After meeting with Captain Bob Burnside at a lifeguard station at Zuma Beach, CA, Rezek realized that rotational molding was the perfect production process for a water rescue device because it produced a watertight seam. It was the toughest plastic available and the tooling was not expensive.

This molding technique also allowed for flexibility in the form so Rezek decided on a torpedo shape and added large side handles and a solid handle at the back to tow in the people being rescued. In 1971, his rescue can was accepted in the California Design show because judges realized it was "the first major design breakthrough in this type of equipment in 50 years." The rescue can was later exhibited at the Pasadena Art Museum and was also published in House Beautiful in March 1971 and Industrial Design Magazine in December 1971. Rezek sold the company in the 1980s, but his rescue can is still preferred by professional lifeguards and the actors carrying the red buoys under their arms on the show Baywatch.

In 1978, Rezek started Ron Rezek Lighting to design and sell contemporary decorative lighting and furniture. He maintained a showroom in SoHo, New York and West Los Angeles, and an office and warehouse in Culver City. His steel-and-chrome desk lamp, hanging steel-and-aluminum desk lamp and chrome-steel-and-maple table were included in the 1976 California Design show. In 2004, he sold the company to the Italian lighting company, Artemide.

While the majority of new furnishing products are adaptations of traditional styles, Rezek has focused his work on advancing the modern idiom. "Rezek's philosophy has been to subtract as many of the details as possible and rely on what he calls 'pure geometry,'" wrote Charlyne Varkonyi Schaub in the South Florida Sun-Sentinel.

In the late 1980s, the designer of contemporary products tackled the traditional ceiling fan form. He had never owned a fan when he was hired by a ceiling fan company to create a contemporary-looking one, the New York Times wrote. "At that point, ceiling fans had never really been a design object," Rezek told reporter Julie Scelfo. "Most of the fans on the market were reproduction Victorian fans, and if a guy had a Mies van der Rohe apartment in Chicago, he probably wasn't going to put one in there."

For a century (1882–1986), ceiling fans were made in Victorian or other traditional, ornamental styles. In 1988, Rezek created the first contemporary ceiling fan, the Stratos, "which introduced a more modern, stream-lined aesthetic".

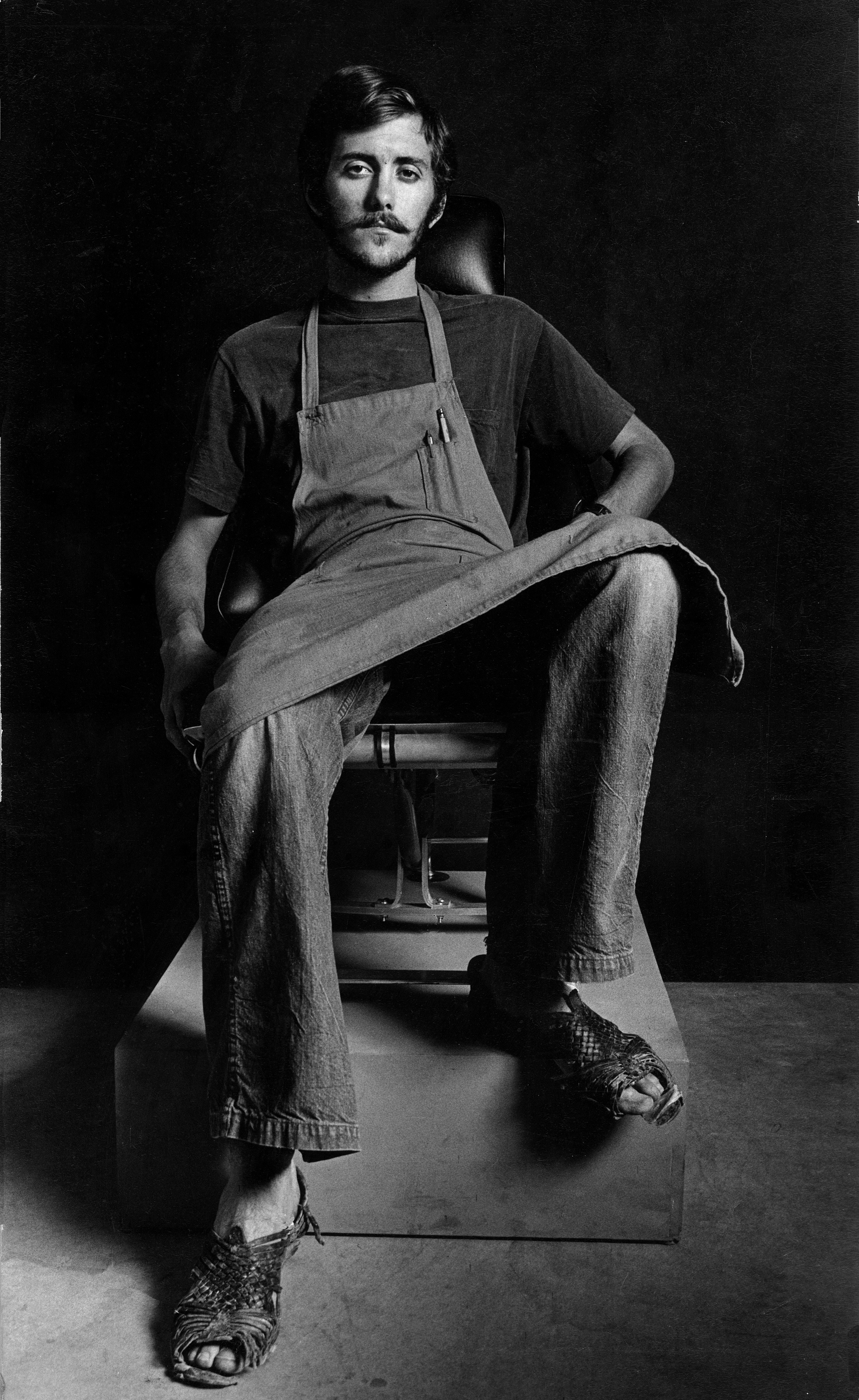
The Vista Press, Vista, California, September 18, 1968. Vista resident and UCLA graduate student Ron Rezek wins design contest for his original chair.

Rezek was granted patents in 1991 for the fan's design and mechanical innovations. Rezek was the first to eliminate blade irons holding fan blades. With his patented invention of rotor slots, blades slip into the rotor. His rotor ended the out-of-balance problems and tedious assembly required with classic blade iron configurations. "His Stratos revolutionized the ceiling fan," wrote Washington Post writer Patricia Dane Rogers.

Two years later, Rezek created seven more innovative fans and in 1997, he began The Modern Fan Co. in Ashland, Oregon, which Architectural Record cites as offering original, "graceful designs for normally clunky fixtures."

Rezek has worked independently as an industrial designer, designing original products for his companies as well as Herman Miller office equipment, Design Within Reach, Artemide, Monarch Mirror, Del Rey Lighting, Fredrick Raymond Lighting, Halsey Lighting, Lavi Industries and others.

In his early career, he taught at UCLA's art and architecture departments, the Art Center College of Design and Southern California Institute of Architecture.

In 1990, Ron launched Highlights, lighting showrooms in California -- Santa Monica, San Francisco and San Diego – as well as Seattle and Miami. He designed each showroom to be a unique "gallery of lights" featuring the best in modern design. In 2002, he sold the showrooms.

His most recent notable designs include a line of ceiling fans for his company, The Period Arts Fan Co. Each of the fan models are inspired by American and Europeans design movements of the 20th Century, including Arts and Crafts movement, Neoclassicism, Art Nouveau, Wiener Werkstatte, Viennese Secessionism, Bauhaus along with Futurism and French Art Deco.

His designs have been exhibited in museums and have appeared in movies, TV shows, books and magazines.
