= Droplet nucleus =

Aerosols formed from the evaporation of respiratory droplets

Droplet nuclei are aerosols formed from the evaporation of respiratory droplets. They are generally smaller than 5 μm in diameter. Droplet nuclei are formed by the "dried residua of larger respiratory droplets". These particles are "the vehicle for airborne respiratory disease transmission, which are the dried-out residual of droplets possibly containing infectious pathogens". Diseases such as tuberculosis and COVID-19 can be transmitted via droplet nuclei.

== See also ==
- Basic reproduction number
