= Thermal boundary layer thickness and shape =

Properties of a thermal boundary layer

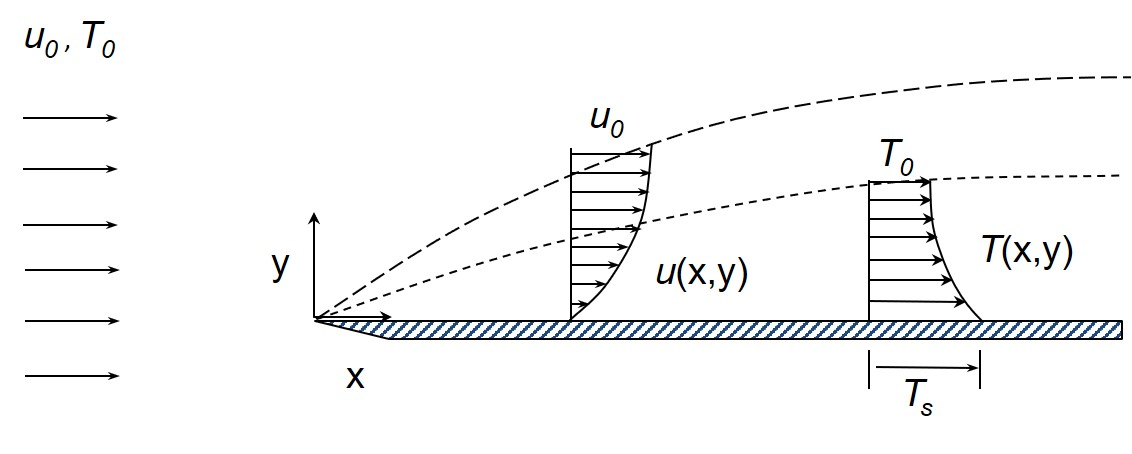
Schematic drawing depicting fluid flow over a heated flat plate.

This page describes some parameters used to characterize the properties of the thermal boundary layer formed by a heated (or cooled) fluid moving along a heated (or cooled) wall. In many ways, the thermal boundary layer description parallels the velocity (momentum) boundary layer description first conceptualized by Ludwig Prandtl. Consider a fluid of uniform temperature $T_o$ and velocity $u_o$ impinging onto a stationary plate uniformly heated to a temperature $T_s$. Assume the flow and the plate are semi-infinite in the positive/negative direction perpendicular to the $x-y$ plane. As the fluid flows along the wall, the fluid at the wall surface satisfies a no-slip boundary condition and has zero velocity, but as you move away from the wall, the velocity of the flow asymptotically approaches the free stream velocity $u_0$. The temperature at the solid wall is $T_s$ and gradually changes to $T_o$ as one moves toward the free stream of the fluid. It is impossible to define a sharp point at which the thermal boundary layer fluid or the velocity boundary layer fluid becomes the free stream, yet these layers have a well-defined characteristic thickness given by $\delta_T$ and $\delta_v$. The parameters below provide a useful definition of this characteristic, measurable thickness for the thermal boundary layer. Also included in this boundary layer description are some parameters useful in describing the shape of the thermal boundary layer.

== 99% thermal boundary layer thickness ==
The thermal boundary layer thickness, $\delta_T$, is the distance across a boundary layer from the wall to a point where the flow temperature has essentially reached the 'free stream' temperature, $T_0$. This distance is defined normal to the wall in the $y$-direction. The thermal boundary layer thickness is customarily defined as the point in the boundary layer, $y_{99}$, where the temperature $T(x,y)$ reaches 99% of the free stream value $T_0$:

$\delta_T = y_{99}$ such that $T(x,y_{99})$ = 0.99 $T_0$

at a position $x$ along the wall. In a real fluid, this quantity can be estimated by measuring the temperature profile at a position $x$ along the wall. The temperature profile is the temperature as a function of $y$ at a fixed $x$ position.

For laminar flow over a flat plate at zero incidence, the thermal boundary layer thickness is given by:

$$\delta_T = \delta_v \mathrm{Pr}^{-1/3}$$
$$\delta_T = 5.0 {}\sqrt{ {\nu  x}\over u_0} \mathrm{Pr}^{-1/3}$$

where

$\mathrm{Pr}$ is the Prandtl Number
$\delta_v$ is the thickness of the velocity boundary layer thickness
$u_0$ is the freestream velocity
$x$ is the distance downstream from the start of the boundary layer
$\nu$ is the kinematic viscosity

For turbulent flow over a flat plate, the thickness of the thermal boundary layer that is formed is not determined by thermal diffusion, but instead, it is random fluctuations in the outer region of the boundary layer of the fluid that is the driving force determining thermal boundary layer thickness. Thus the thermal boundary layer thickness for turbulent flow does not depend on the Prandtl number but instead on the Reynolds number. Hence, the turbulent thermal boundary layer thickness is given approximately by the turbulent velocity boundary layer thickness expression given by:

$$\delta_T \approx \delta \approx 0.37x/ {\mathrm{Re}_x}^{1/5}$$

where

${\mathrm{Re}_x}= u_0 x/\nu$ is the Reynolds number

This turbulent boundary layer thickness formula assumes 1) the flow is turbulent right from the start of the boundary layer and 2) the turbulent boundary layer behaves in a geometrically similar manner (i.e. the velocity profiles are geometrically similar along the flow in the x-direction, differing only by stretching factors in $y$ and $u(x,y)$). Neither one of these assumptions is true for the general turbulent boundary layer case so care must be exercised in applying this formula.

== Thermal displacement thickness ==
The thermal displacement thickness, $\beta^*$ may be thought of in terms of the difference between a real fluid and a hypothetical fluid with thermal diffusion turned off but with velocity $u_0$ and temperature $T_0$. With no thermal diffusion, the temperature drop is abrupt. The thermal displacement thickness is the distance by which the hypothetical fluid surface would have to be moved in the $y$-direction to give the same integrated temperature as occurs between the wall and the reference plane at $\delta_T$ in the real fluid. It is a direct analog to the velocity displacement thickness which is often described in terms of an equivalent shift of a hypothetical inviscid fluid (see Schlichting for velocity displacement thickness).

The definition of the thermal displacement thickness for incompressible flow is based on the integral of the reduced temperature:

$${\beta^*}= \int_0^\infty {\theta(x,y) \,\mathrm{d}y}$$

where the dimensionless temperature is $\theta(x,y) = (T(x,y)-T_0)/(T_s-T_0)$. In a wind tunnel, the velocity and temperature profiles are obtained by measuring the velocity and temperature at many discrete $y$-values at a fixed $x$-position. The thermal displacement thickness can then be estimated by numerically integrating the scaled temperature profile.

== Moment method ==
A relatively new method for describing the thickness and shape of the thermal boundary layer utilizes the moment method commonly used to describe a random variable's probability distribution. The moment method was developed from the observation that the plot of the second derivative of the thermal profile for laminar flow over a plate looks very much like a Gaussian distribution curve. It is straightforward to cast the properly scaled thermal profile into a suitable integral kernel.

The thermal profile central moments are defined as:

$${\xi_n} = {1\over\beta^*}\int_0^\infty { (y- m_T)^n  \theta(x,y) \mathrm{d}y}$$

where the mean location, $m_T$, is given by:

$$m_T = {1\over\beta^*}\int_0^\infty { y \theta(x,y)  \mathrm{d}y}$$

There are some advantages to also include descriptions of moments of the boundary layer profile derivatives with respect to the height above the wall. Consider the first derivative temperature profile central moments given by:

$${\epsilon_n} = \int_0^\infty { (y-{\beta^*})^n {d \theta(x,y) \over dy} \mathrm{d}y}$$

where the mean location is the thermal displacement thickness $\beta^*$.

Finally the second derivative temperature profile central moments are given by:

$${\phi_n} = \mu_T \int_0^\infty { (y-{\mu_T})^n {d^2  \theta(x,y) \over dy^2} \mathrm{d}y}$$

where the mean location, $\mu_T$, is given by:

$${1 \over \mu_T} = -\left( \frac{d\theta(x,y) }{d y}\right)_{y=0}$$

With the moments and the thermal mean location defined, the boundary layer thickness and shape can be described in terms of the thermal boundary layer width (variance), thermal skewnesses, and thermal excess (excess kurtosis). For the Pohlhausen solution for laminar flow on a heated flat plate, it is found that thermal boundary layer thickness defined as $\delta_T = m_T + 4\sigma_T$ where $\sigma_T=\xi_2^{1/2}$, tracks the 99% thickness very well.

For laminar flow, the three different moment cases all give similar values for the thermal boundary layer thickness. For turbulent flow, the thermal boundary layer can be divided into a region near the wall where thermal diffusion is important and an outer region where thermal diffusion effects are mostly absent. Taking a cue from the boundary layer energy balance equation, the second derivative boundary layer moments, ${\phi_n}$ track the thickness and shape of that portion of the thermal boundary layer where thermal diffusivity ${\alpha }$ is significant. Hence the moment method makes it possible to track and quantify the region where thermal diffusivity is important using ${\phi_n}$ moments whereas the overall thermal boundary layer is tracked using ${\epsilon_n}$ and ${\xi_n}$ moments.

Calculation of the derivative moments without the need to take derivatives is simplified by using integration by parts to reduce the moments to simply integrals based on the thermal displacement thickness kernel:

$${k_n}= \int_0^\infty {y^n\theta(x,y) \,\mathrm{d}y}$$

This means that the second derivative skewness, for example, can be calculated as:

$$\gamma_{T} = \phi_3/\phi_2^{3/2} = (2\mu_T^3 - 6\beta^*\mu_T^2 + 6\mu_T k_1)/(-\mu_T^2 + 2\mu_T\beta^*)^{3/2}$$
