= Boundary layer thickness =

This page describes some of the parameters used to characterize the thickness and shape of boundary layers formed by fluid flowing along a solid surface. The defining characteristic of boundary layer flow is that at the solid walls, the fluid's velocity is reduced to zero. The boundary layer refers to the thin transition layer between the wall and the bulk fluid flow. The boundary layer concept was originally developed by Ludwig Prandtl and is broadly classified into two types, bounded and unbounded. The differentiating property between bounded and unbounded boundary layers is whether the boundary layer is being substantially influenced by more than one wall. Each of the main types has a laminar, transitional, and turbulent sub-type. The two types of boundary layers use similar methods to describe the thickness and shape of the transition region with a couple of exceptions detailed in the Unbounded Boundary Layer Section. The characterizations detailed below consider steady flow but is easily extended to unsteady flow.

== The bounded boundary layer description ==
Bounded boundary layers is a name used to designate fluid flow along an interior wall such that the other interior walls induce a pressure effect on the fluid flow along the wall under consideration. The defining characteristic of this type of boundary layer is that the velocity profile normal to the wall often smoothly asymptotes to a constant velocity value denoted as u_{e}(x). The bounded boundary layer concept is depicted for steady flow entering the lower half of a thin flat plate 2-D channel of height H in Figure 1 (the flow and the plate extends in the positive/negative direction perpendicular to the x-y-plane). Examples of this type of boundary layer flow occur for fluid flow through most pipes, channels, and wind tunnels. The 2-D channel depicted in Figure 1 is stationary with fluid flowing along the interior wall with time-averaged velocity u(x,y) where x is the flow direction and y is the normal to the wall. The H/2 dashed line is added to acknowledge that this is an interior pipe or channel flow situation and that there is a top wall located above the pictured lower wall. Figure 1 depicts flow behavior for H values that are larger than the maximum boundary layer thickness but less than thickness at which the flow starts to behave as an exterior flow. If the wall-to-wall distance, H, is less than the viscous boundary layer thickness then the velocity profile, defined as u(x,y) at x for all y, takes on a parabolic profile in the y-direction and the boundary layer thickness is just H/2.

At the solid walls of the plate the fluid has zero velocity (no-slip boundary condition), but as you move away from the wall, the velocity of the flow increases without peaking, and then approaches a constant mean velocity u_{e}(x). This asymptotic velocity may or may not change along the wall depending on the wall geometry. The point where the velocity profile essentially reaches the asymptotic velocity is the boundary layer thickness. The boundary layer thickness is depicted as the curved dashed line originating at the channel entrance in Figure 1. It is impossible to define an exact location at which the velocity profile reaches the asymptotic velocity. As a result, a number of boundary layer thickness parameters, generally denoted as $\delta(x)$, are used to describe characteristic thickness scales in the boundary layer region. Also of interest is the velocity profile shape which is useful in differentiating laminar from turbulent boundary layer flows. The profile shape refers to the y-behavior of the velocity profile as it transitions to u_{e}(x).

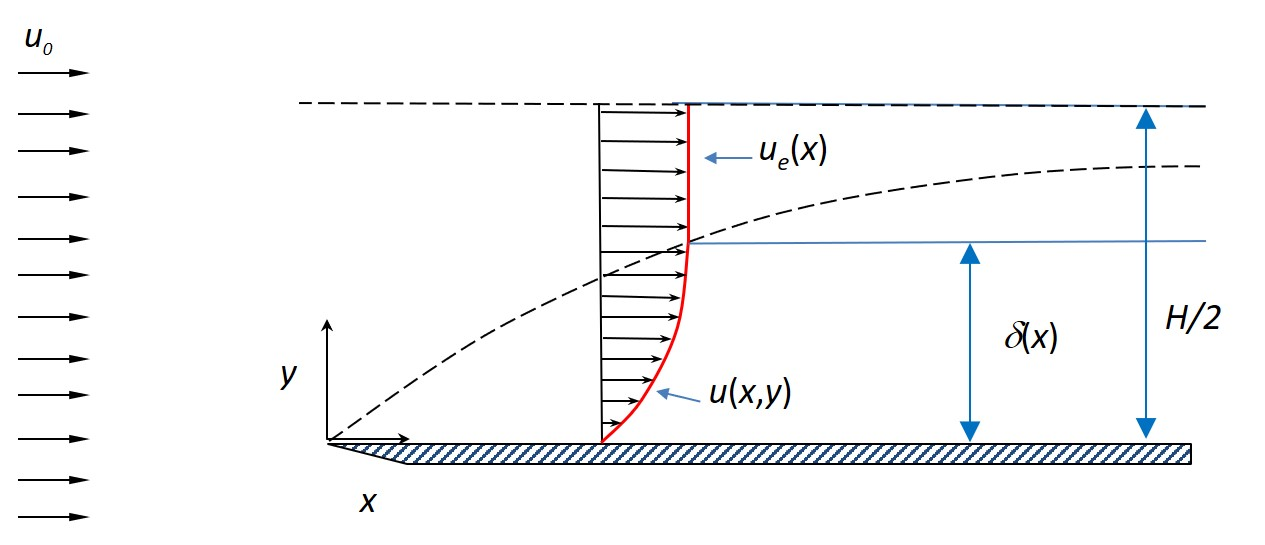
Figure 1: Schematic drawing depicting fluid flow entering the bottom half of a 2-D channel with plate-to-plate spacing of H. The flow and channel extend perpendicular to the x-y-plane.

=== The 99% boundary layer thickness ===
The boundary layer thickness, $\delta$, is the distance normal to the wall to a point where the flow velocity has essentially reached the 'asymptotic' velocity, $u_e$. Prior to the development of the Moment Method, the lack of an obvious method of defining the boundary layer thickness led much of the flow community in the later half of the 1900s to adopt the location $y_{99}$, denoted as $\delta _{99}$ and given by

$$u(x,y_{99}) = 0.99u_e(x) \quad ,$$

as the boundary layer thickness.

For laminar boundary layer flows along a flat plate channel that behave according to the Blasius solution conditions, the $\delta _{99}$ value is closely approximated by

$$\delta _{99}(x)\approx 5.0 \sqrt{ {\nu  x}\over u_0} = 5.0 {x \over \sqrt{\mathrm{Re}_x}} \quad ,$$

where $u_e \approx u_0$ is constant, and where

$\mathrm{Re}_x$ is the Reynolds number,
$u_0$ is the freestream velocity,
$u_e$ is the asymptotic velocity,
$x$ is the distance downstream from the start of the boundary layer, and
$\nu$ is the kinematic viscosity.

For turbulent boundary layers along a flat plate channel, the boundary layer thickness, $\delta$, is given by

$$\delta (x) \approx 0.37 {x \over {\mathrm{Re}_x}^{1/5}} \quad .$$

This turbulent boundary layer thickness formula assumes 1) the flow is turbulent right from the start of the boundary layer and 2) the turbulent boundary layer behaves in a geometrically similar manner (i.e. the velocity profiles are geometrically similar along with the flow in the x-direction, differing only by scaling parameters in $y$ and $u(x,y)$). Neither one of these assumptions is true for the general turbulent boundary layer case so care must be exercised in applying this formula.

=== Displacement thickness ===
The displacement thickness, $\delta_1$ or $\delta^*$, is the normal distance to a reference plane representing the lower edge of a hypothetical inviscid fluid of uniform velocity $u_e$ that has the same flow rate as occurs in the real fluid with the boundary layer.

The displacement thickness essentially modifies the shape of a body immersed in a fluid to allow, in principle, an inviscid solution if the displacement thicknesses were known a priori.

The definition of the displacement thickness for compressible flow, based on mass flow rate, is

$${\delta_1(x)}= \int_0^{H/2} {\left(1-{\rho(x,y) u(x,y)\over \rho_e u_e(x)}\right) \,\mathrm{d}y} \quad ,$$

where $\rho (x,y)$ is the density. For incompressible flow, the density is constant so the definition based on volumetric flow rate becomes

$${\delta_1(x)}= \int_0^{H/2} {\left(1-{u(x,y)\over u_e(x)}\right) \,\mathrm{d}y} \quad .$$

For turbulent boundary layer calculations, the time-averaged density and velocity are used.

For laminar boundary layer flows along a flat plate that behave according to the Blasius solution conditions, the displacement thickness is

$$\delta_1(x) \approx 1.72 \sqrt{{\nu x}\over u_0} \quad ,$$

where $u_e \approx u_0$ is constant.

The displacement thickness is not directly related to the boundary layer thickness but is given approximately as $\delta_1 \approx \delta /3$. It has a prominent role in calculating the Shape Factor. It also shows up in various formulas in the Moment Method.

=== Momentum thickness ===
The momentum thickness, $\theta$ or $\delta_2$, is the normal distance to a reference plane representing the lower edge of a hypothetical inviscid fluid of uniform velocity $u_e$ that has the same momentum flow rate as occurs in the real fluid with the boundary layer.

The momentum thickness definition for compressible flow based on the mass flow rate is

$$\delta_2(x) = \int_0^{H/2} {{\rho(x,y) u(x,y)\over \rho_e u_e(x)} {\left(1 - {u(x,y)\over u_e(x)} \right)}} \,\mathrm{d}y \quad .$$

For incompressible flow, the density is constant so that the definition based on volumetric flow rate becomes

$$\delta_2(x) = \int_0^{H/2} {{u(x,y)\over u_e(x)} {\left(1 - {u(x,y)\over u_e(x)}\right)}} \,\mathrm{d}y \quad ,$$

where $\rho$ are the density and $u_e$ is the 'asymptotic' velocity.

For turbulent boundary layer calculations, the time averaged density and velocity are used.

For laminar boundary layer flows along a flat plate that behave according to the Blasius solution conditions, the momentum thickness is

$$\delta_2(x) \approx 0.664 \sqrt{{\nu x}\over u_0} \quad ,$$

where $u_e \approx u_0$ is constant.

The momentum thickness is not directly related to the boundary layer thickness but is given approximately as $\delta_2 \approx \delta /6$. It has a prominent role in calculating the Shape Factor.

A related parameter called the Energy Thickness is sometimes mentioned in reference to turbulent energy distribution but is rarely used.

=== Shape factor ===
A shape factor is used in boundary layer flow to help to differentiate laminar and turbulent flow. It also shows up in various approximate treatments of the boundary layer including the Thwaites method for laminar flows. The formal definition is given by

$$H_{12}(x) = \frac {\delta_1(x)}{\delta_2(x)} \quad ,$$

where $H_{12}$ is the shape factor, $\delta_1$ is the displacement thickness and $\delta_2$ is the momentum thickness.

Conventionally, $H_{12}$ = 2.59 (Blasius boundary layer) is typical of laminar flows, while $H_{12}$ = 1.3 - 1.4 is typical of turbulent flows near the laminar-turbulent transition. For turbulent flows near separation, $H_{12} \approx$2.7. The dividing line defining laminar-transitional and transitional-turbulent $H_{12}$ values is dependent on a number of factors so it is not always a definitive parameter for differentiating laminar, transitional, or turbulent boundary layers.

=== Moment method ===
A relatively new method for describing the thickness and shape of the boundary layer uses the mathematical moment methodology which is commonly used to characterize statistical probability functions. The boundary layer moment method was developed from the observation that the plot of the second derivative of the Blasius boundary layer for laminar flow over a plate looks very much like a Gaussian distribution curve. The implication of the second derivative Gaussian-like shape is that the velocity profile shape for laminar flow is closely approximated as a twice integrated Gaussian function.

The moment method is based on simple integrals of the velocity profile that use the entire profile, not just a few tail region data points as does $\delta_{99}$. The moment method introduces four new parameters that help describe the thickness and shape of the boundary layer. These four parameters are the mean location, the boundary layer width, the velocity profile skewness, and the velocity profile excess. The skewness and excess are true shape parameters as opposed to the simple ratio parameters like the H_{12}. Applying the moment method to the first and second derivatives of the velocity profile generates additional parameters that, for example, determine the location, shape, and thickness of the viscous forces in a turbulent boundary layer. A unique property of the moment method parameters is that it is possible to prove that many of these velocity thickness parameters are also similarity scaling parameters. That is, if similarity is present in a set of velocity profiles, then these thickness parameters must also be similarity length scaling parameters.

It is straightforward to cast the properly scaled velocity profile and its first two derivatives into suitable integral kernels.

The central moments based on the scaled velocity profiles are defined as

$${\zeta_n(x)}= \int_0^{H/2} {(y-m(x))^n {1\over\delta_1(x)} \left(1-{u(x,y)\over u_e(x)}\right) \mathrm{d}y} \quad ,$$

where $\delta_1(x)$ is the displacement thickness and the mean location, $m(x)$ is given by

$$m(x) = \int_0^{H/2} { y {1\over\delta_1(x)} \left(1-{u(x,y)\over u_e(x)}\right) \mathrm{d}y}  \quad .$$

There are some advantages to also include descriptions of moments of the boundary layer profile derivatives with respect to the height above the wall. Consider the first derivative velocity profile central moments given by

$${\kappa_n(x)} = \int_0^{H/2} { (y-{\delta_1(x)})^n {d \{u(x,y)/u_e(x) \} \over dy} \mathrm{d}y}   \quad ,$$

where the first derivative mean location is the displacement thickness $\delta_1(x)$.

Finally the second derivative velocity profile central moments are given by

$${\lambda_n(x)} = \int_0^{H/2} { (y-{\mu_1(x)})^n {d^2 \{-\mu_1(x) u(x,y)/u_e(x) \} \over dy^2} \mathrm{d}y} \quad  ,$$

where the second derivative mean location, $\mu_1(x)$, is given by

$${\mu_1(x)} =  {u_{e}(x)  \over \left.{\frac{{du(x,y)}}{{dy}}} \right|_{y = 0}} = {\upsilon u_e(x) \over \tau_w(x)} \quad ,$$

where $\upsilon$ is the viscosity and where $\tau_w(x)$ is the wall shear stress. The mean location, $\mu_1$, for this case is formally defined as u_{e}(x) divided by the area under the second derivative curve.

The above equations work for both laminar and turbulent boundary layers as long as the time-averaged velocity is used for the turbulent case.

With the moments and the mean locations defined, the boundary layer thickness and shape can be described in terms of the boundary layer widths (variance), skewnesses, and excesses (excess kurtosis). Experimentally, it is found that the thickness defined as $\delta_m = m + 3\sigma_m$ where $\sigma_m=\zeta_2^{1/2}$, tracks the $\delta_{99}$ very well for turbulent boundary layer flows.

Taking a cue from the boundary layer momentum balance equations, the second derivative boundary layer moments, ${\lambda_n}$ track the thickness and shape of that portion of the boundary layer where the viscous forces are significant. Hence the moment method makes it possible to track and quantify the laminar boundary layer and the inner viscous region of turbulent boundary layers using ${\lambda_n}$ moments whereas the boundary layer thickness and shape of the total turbulent boundary layer is tracked using ${\zeta_n}$ and ${\kappa_n}$ moments.

Calculation of the 2nd derivative moments can be problematic since under certain conditions the second derivatives can become positive in the very near-wall region (in general, it is negative). This appears to be the case for interior flow with an adverse pressure gradient (APG). Integrand values do not change sign in standard probability framework so the application of the moment methodology to the second derivative case will result in biased moment measures. A simple fix is to exclude the problematic values and define a new set of moments for a truncated second derivative profile starting at the second derivative minimum. If the width, ${\sigma_v}$, is calculated using the minimum as the mean location, then the viscous boundary layer thickness, defined as the point where the second derivative profile becomes negligible above the wall, can be properly identified with this modified approach.

For derivative moments whose integrands do not change sign, the moments can be calculated without the need to take derivatives by using integration by parts to reduce the moments to simply integrals based on the displacement thickness kernel given by

$${\alpha_n}(x)= \int_0^{H/2} {y^n \left(1-{u(x,y)\over u_e(x)}\right) \mathrm{d}y}   \quad .$$

For example, the second derivative $\sigma_v$ value is $\sigma_v = \sqrt{{-\mu_1}^2+2\mu_1 \alpha_0}$ and the first derivative skewness, $\gamma_1$, can be calculated as

$$\gamma_{1}(x) = \kappa_3/\kappa_{2}^{3/2} = (2\delta_1^{3} - 6\delta_1 \alpha_1 + 3\alpha_2)/(2\alpha_1 - \delta_1^{2})^{3/2} \quad  .$$

This parameter was shown to track the boundary layer shape changes that accompany the laminar to turbulent boundary layer transition.

Numerical errors encountered in calculating the moments, especially the higher-order moments, are a serious concern. Small experimental or numerical errors can cause the nominally free stream portion of the integrands to blow up. There are certain numerical calculation recommendations that can be followed to mitigate these errors.

== The unbounded boundary layer description ==
Unbounded boundary layers, as the name implies, are typically exterior boundary layer flows along walls (and some very large gap interior flows in channels and pipes). Although not widely appreciated, the defining characteristic of this type of flow is that the velocity profile goes through a peak near the viscous boundary layer edge and then slowly asymptotes to the free stream velocity u_{0}. An example of this type of boundary layer flow is near-wall air flow over a wing in flight. The unbounded boundary layer concept is depicted for steady laminar flow along a flat plate in Figure 2. The lower dashed curve represents the location of the maximum velocity u_{max}(x) and the upper dashed curve represents the location where u(x,y) essentially becomes u_{0}, i.e. the boundary layer thickness location. For the very thin flat plate case, the peak is small resulting in the flat plate exterior boundary layer closely resembling the interior flow flat channel case. This has led much of the fluid flow literature to incorrectly treat the bounded and unbounded cases as equivalent. The problem with this equivalence thinking is that the maximum peak value can easily exceed 10-15% of u_{0} for flow along a wing in flight. The differences between the bounded and unbounded boundary layer was explored in a series of Air Force Reports.

The unbounded boundary layer peak means that some of the velocity profile thickness and shape parameters that are used for interior bounded boundary layer flows need to be revised for this case. Among other differences, the laminar unbounded boundary layer case includes viscous and inertial dominated regions similar to turbulent boundary layer flows.

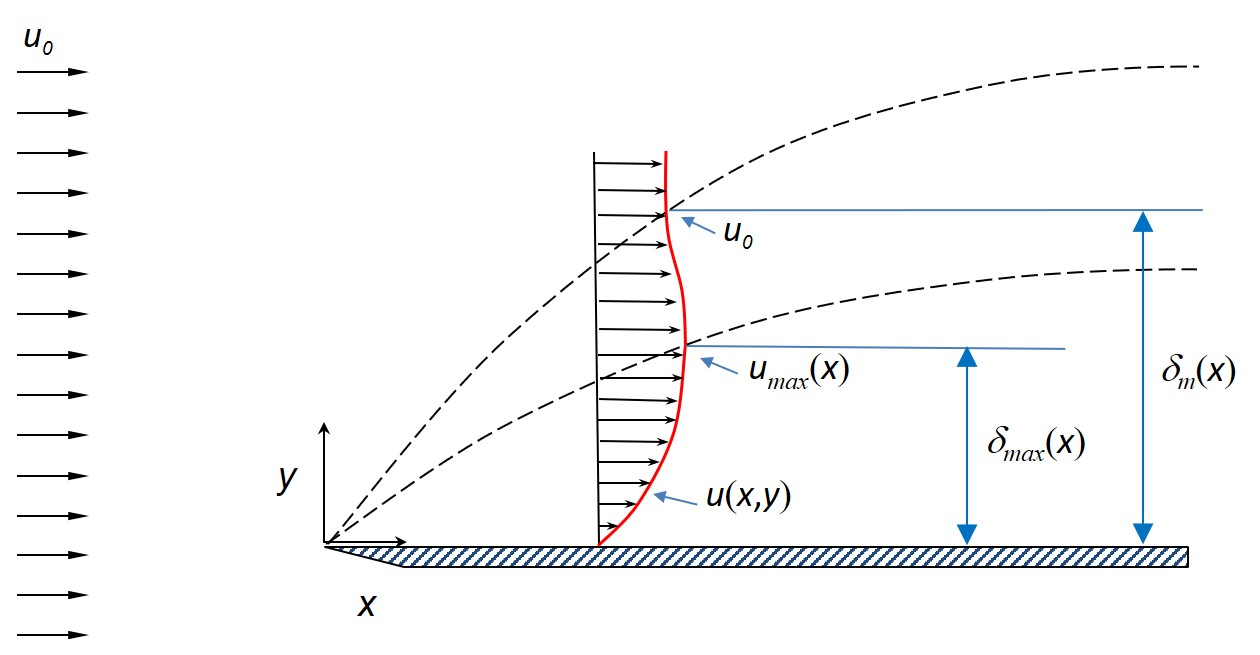
Figure 2: The depiction of the laminar “unbounded” boundary layer along a 2-D flat plate with the flow and plate extending perpendicular to the x-y-plane.

=== Moment method ===
For exterior unbounded boundary layer flows, it is necessary to modify the moment equations to achieve the desired goal of estimating the various boundary layer thickness locations. The peaking behavior of the velocity profile means the area normalization of the $\zeta_n(x)$ moments becomes problematic. To avoid this problem, it has been suggested that the unbounded boundary layer be divided into viscous and inertial regions and that the boundary layer thickness can then be calculated using separate moment integrals specific to that region. That is, the inner viscous region of laminar and turbulent unbounded boundary layer regions can be tracked using modified ${\lambda_n}$ moments whereas the inertial boundary layer thickness can be tracked using modified ${\zeta_n}$ and ${\kappa_n}$ moments. The slow rate at which the peak asymptotes to the free stream velocity means that the calculated boundary layer thickness values are typically much larger than the bounded boundary layer case.

The modified ${\zeta_n}$ and ${\kappa_n}$ moments for the inertial boundary layer region are created by: 1) replacing the lower integral limit by the location of the velocity peak designated by ${\delta_{max}}$, 2) changing the upper integral limit to h where h is located deep in the free stream, and 3) changing the velocity scale from $u_e$ to $u_0$. The displacement thickness in the modified moments must be calculated using the same integral limits as the modified moment integrals. By taking $\delta_{max}$ as the mean location, the modified 3-sigma boundary layer thickness becomes $\delta_m = \delta_{max} + 3\sigma_i$ where $\sigma_i$ is the modified ${\zeta_2^{1/2}}$ width.

The modified ${\lambda_n}$ second derivative moments can be calculated using the same integrals as defined above but with $\delta_{max}$ replacing H/2 for the upper integral limit. To avoid numerical errors, certain calculation recommendations should be followed. The same concerns for the second derivative moments in regards to APG bounded boundary layers for the bounded case above also apply to the modified moments for the unbounded case.

An example of the modified moments are shown for unbounded boundary layer flow along a wing section in Figure 3. This figure was generated from a 2-D simulation for laminar airflow over a NACA_0012 wing section. Included in this figure are the modified 3-sigma $\delta _{m}$, the modified 3-sigma $\delta _{v}$, and the $\delta _{99}$ locations. The modified $\delta _{m}/\delta _{99}$ ratio value is 311, the modified $\delta _{v}/\delta _{99}$ ratio value is ~2, and the $u_{max}$ value is 9% higher than the $u_{0}$ value. The large difference between the $\delta _{m}$ and $\delta _{v}$ compared to the $\delta _{99}$ value demonstrates the inadequacy of the $\delta _{99}$ boundary layer thickness. Furthermore, the large velocity peak demonstrates the problem with treating interior bounded boundary layers as equivalent to exterior unbounded boundary layers.

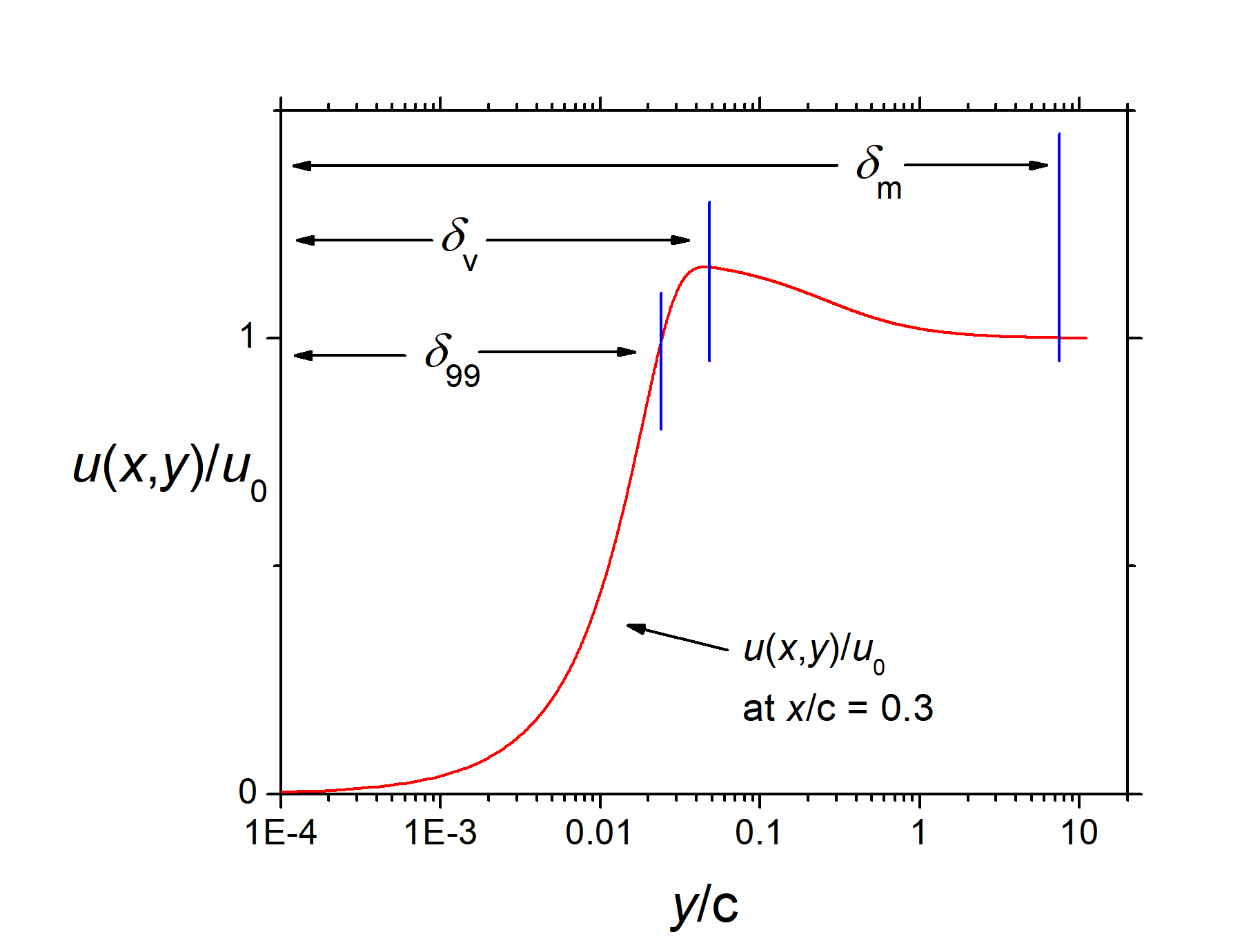
Figure 3: The velocity profile from a NACA0012 airfoil simulation at x/c = 0.3.

=== δ_{max} thickness ===
The location of the velocity peak, denoted as $\delta_{max}$ is an obvious demarcation location for the unbounded boundary layer. The main appeal of this choice is that this location is approximately the dividing location between the viscous and inertial regions. For the laminar flow simulation along a wing, u_{max} located at δ_{max} is found to approximate the viscous boundary layer thickness given as $\delta_{max} \approx \delta_v^{4.3} = \mu_1$+$4.3\sigma_v$ indicating the velocity peaks just above the viscous boundary layer thickness δ_{v}. For the inertial regions of both laminar and turbulent flows, $\delta_{max}$ is a convenient lower boundary for the moment integrals. If the width, ${\sigma_i}$, is calculated using $\delta_{max}$ as the mean location then the boundary layer thickness, defined as the point where the velocity essentially becomes u_{0} above the wall, can then be properly identified.

=== The 99% boundary layer thickness ===
A significant implication of the peaking behavior is that the 99% thickness, $\delta _{99}$, is NOT recommended as a thickness parameter for the exterior flow, unbounded boundary layer since it no longer corresponds to a boundary layer location of consequence. It is only useful for unbounded laminar flow along a very thin flat plate at zero incidence angle to the flow direction since the peak for this case will be very small and the velocity profile will be closely approximated as the bounded boundary layer case. For thick plates-walls, non-zero incidence angles, or flow around most solid surfaces, the excess flow due to form drag results in a near-wall peak in the velocity profile making $\delta _{99}$ not useful.

=== Displacement thickness, momentum thickness, and shape factor ===
The displacement thickness, momentum thickness, and shape factor can, in principle, all be calculated using the same approach described above for the bounded boundary layer case. However, the peaked nature of the unbounded boundary layer means the inertial section of the displacement thickness and momentum thickness will tend to cancel the near wall portion. Hence, the displacement thickness and momentum thickness will behave differently for the bounded and unbounded cases. One option to make the unbounded displacement thickness and momentum thickness approximately behave as the bounded case is to use u_{max} as the scaling parameter and δ_{max} as the upper integral limit.
