= Linearity =

Properties of mathematical relationships

In mathematics, the term linear is used in two distinct senses for two different properties:

- linearity of a function (or mapping);
- linearity of a polynomial.

An example of a linear function is the function defined by $f(x)=(ax,bx)$ that maps the real line to a line in the Euclidean plane R^{2} that passes through the origin. An example of a linear polynomial in the variables $X,$ $Y$ and $Z$ is $aX+bY+cZ+d.$

Linearity of a mapping is closely related to proportionality. Examples in physics include the linear relationship of voltage and current in an electrical conductor (Ohm's law), and the relationship of mass and weight. By contrast, more complicated relationships, such as between velocity and kinetic energy, are nonlinear.

Generalized for functions in more than one dimension, linearity means the property of a function of being compatible with addition and scaling, also known as the superposition principle.

Linearity of a polynomial means that its degree is less than two. The use of the term for polynomials stems from the fact that the graph of a polynomial in one variable is a straight line. In the term "linear equation", the word refers to the linearity of the polynomials involved.

Because a function such as $f(x)=ax+b$ is defined by a linear polynomial in its argument, it is sometimes also referred to as being a "linear function", and the relationship between the argument and the function value may be referred to as a "linear relationship". This is potentially confusing, but usually the intended meaning will be clear from the context.

The word linear comes from Latin linearis, "pertaining to or resembling a line".

== In mathematics ==
=== Linear maps ===
In mathematics, a linear map or linear function f(x) is a function that satisfies the two properties:

- Additivity: f(x + y) = f(x) + f(y).
- Homogeneity of degree 1: f(αx) = α f(x) for all α.

These properties are known as the superposition principle. In this definition, x is not necessarily a real number, but can in general be an element of any vector space. A more special definition of linear function, not coinciding with the definition of linear map, is used in elementary mathematics (see below).

Additivity alone implies homogeneity for rational α, since $f(x+x)=f(x)+f(x)$ implies $f(nx)=n f(x)$ for any natural number n by mathematical induction, and then $n f(x) = f(nx)=f(m\tfrac{n}{m}x)= m f(\tfrac{n}{m}x)$ implies $f(\tfrac{n}{m}x) = \tfrac{n}{m} f(x)$. The density of the rational numbers in the reals implies that any additive continuous function is homogeneous for any real number α, and is therefore linear.

The concept of linearity can be extended to linear operators. Important examples of linear operators include the derivative considered as a differential operator, and other operators constructed from it, such as del and the Laplacian. When a differential equation can be expressed in linear form, it can generally be solved by breaking the equation up into smaller pieces, solving each of those pieces, and summing the solutions.

=== Linear polynomials ===
In a different usage to the above definition, a polynomial of degree 1 is said to be linear, because the graph of a function of that form is a straight line.

Over the reals, a simple example of a linear equation is given by
$$y = m x + b,$$
where m is often called the slope or gradient, and b the y-intercept, which gives the point of intersection between the graph of the function and the y axis.

Note that this usage of the term linear is not the same as in the section above, because linear polynomials over the real numbers do not in general satisfy either additivity or homogeneity. In fact, they do so if and only if the constant term – b in the example – equals 0. If b ≠ 0, the function is called an affine function (see in greater generality affine transformation).

Linear algebra is the branch of mathematics concerned with systems of linear equations.

=== Boolean functions ===
Hasse diagram of a linear Boolean function

In Boolean algebra, a linear function is a function $f$ for which there exist $a_0, a_1, \ldots, a_n \in \{0,1\}$ such that

$f(b_1, \ldots, b_n) = a_0 \oplus (a_1 \land b_1) \oplus \cdots \oplus (a_n \land b_n)$, where $b_1, \ldots, b_n \in \{0,1\}.$

Note that if $a_0 = 1$, the above function is considered affine in linear algebra (i.e. not linear).

A Boolean function is linear if one of the following holds for the function's truth table:

1. In every row in which the truth value of the function is T, there are an odd number of Ts assigned to the arguments, and in every row in which the function is F there is an even number of Ts assigned to arguments. Specifically, f(F, F, ..., F) = F, and these functions correspond to linear maps over the Boolean vector space.
2. In every row in which the value of the function is T, there is an even number of Ts assigned to the arguments of the function; and in every row in which the truth value of the function is F, there are an odd number of Ts assigned to arguments. In this case, f(F, F, ..., F) = T.

Another way to express this is that each variable always makes a difference in the truth value of the operation or it never makes a difference.

Negation, Logical biconditional, exclusive or, tautology, and contradiction are linear functions.

== Physics ==
In physics, linearity is a property of the differential equations governing many systems; for instance, the Maxwell equations or the diffusion equation.

Linearity of a homogeneous differential equation means that if two functions f and g are solutions of the equation, then any linear combination af + bg is, too.

In instrumentation, linearity means that a given change in an input variable gives the same change in the output of the measurement apparatus: this is highly desirable in scientific work. In general, instruments are close to linear over a certain range, and most useful within that range. In contrast, human senses are highly nonlinear: for instance, the brain completely ignores incoming light unless it exceeds a certain absolute threshold number of photons.

Linear motion traces a straight line trajectory.

== Electronics ==
In electronics, the linear operating region of a device, for example a transistor, is where an output dependent variable (such as the transistor collector current) is directly proportional to an input dependent variable (such as the base current). This ensures that an analog output is an accurate representation of an input, typically with higher amplitude (amplified). A typical example of linear equipment is a high fidelity audio amplifier, which must amplify a signal without changing its waveform. Others are linear filters, and linear amplifiers in general.

In most scientific and technological, as distinct from mathematical, applications, something may be described as linear if the characteristic is approximately but not exactly a straight line; and linearity may be valid only within a certain operating region—for example, a high-fidelity amplifier may distort a small signal, but sufficiently little to be acceptable (acceptable but imperfect linearity); and may distort very badly if the input exceeds a certain value.

=== Integral linearity ===
For an electronic device (or other physical device) that converts a quantity to another quantity, Bertram S. Kolts writes:

There are three basic definitions for integral linearity in common use: independent linearity, zero-based linearity, and terminal, or end-point, linearity. In each case, linearity defines how well the device's actual performance across a specified operating range approximates a straight line. Linearity is usually measured in terms of a deviation, or non-linearity, from an ideal straight line and it is typically expressed in terms of percent of full scale, or in ppm (parts per million) of full scale. Typically, the straight line is obtained by performing a least-squares fit of the data. The three definitions vary in the manner in which the straight line is positioned relative to the actual device's performance. Also, all three of these definitions ignore any gain, or offset errors that may be present in the actual device's performance characteristics.

== See also ==
- Linear actuator
- Linear element
- Linear foot
- Linear system
- Linear programming
- Linear differential equation
- Bilinear
- Multilinear
- Linear motor
- Linear interpolation
