= Peniche (fluid dynamics) =

A peniche (or stand-off) is material inserted between a half-model, often of an airplane, and the wall of a wind tunnel. Péniche is a French nautical term meaning barge. The purpose of the peniche is to remove or reduce the influence of the boundary layer on the half-model. The effect of the peniche itself in fluid dynamics is not fully understood.

Half-models are used in wind-tunnel testing in aerodynamics, as larger scale half-models in constant pressure tunnels operate at increased Reynolds numbers closer to those of real aircraft. One trade-off is the interaction between the central part of the half-model and the wall boundary layer. Inserting a peniche between the centre line of the half-model and the wall of the wind tunnel attempts to eliminate or reduce that boundary layer effect by creating distance between the model and the wall. Varying widths and shapes of peniches have been used; a peniche that follows the longitudinal cross section contour of the half-model is the simplest.

The peniche itself affects the fluid dynamics around the half-model. It increases the local angle of attack on an inboard wing, while having no influence on an outboard wing. The blocking of the peniche in the flow field leads to further displacement of the flow, which in turn leads to higher flow speeds and local angles of attack. How strong of an effect the peniche has is a function of the angle of attack, with the effect present at all angles.
