= Paul Richard Heinrich Blasius =

German physicist

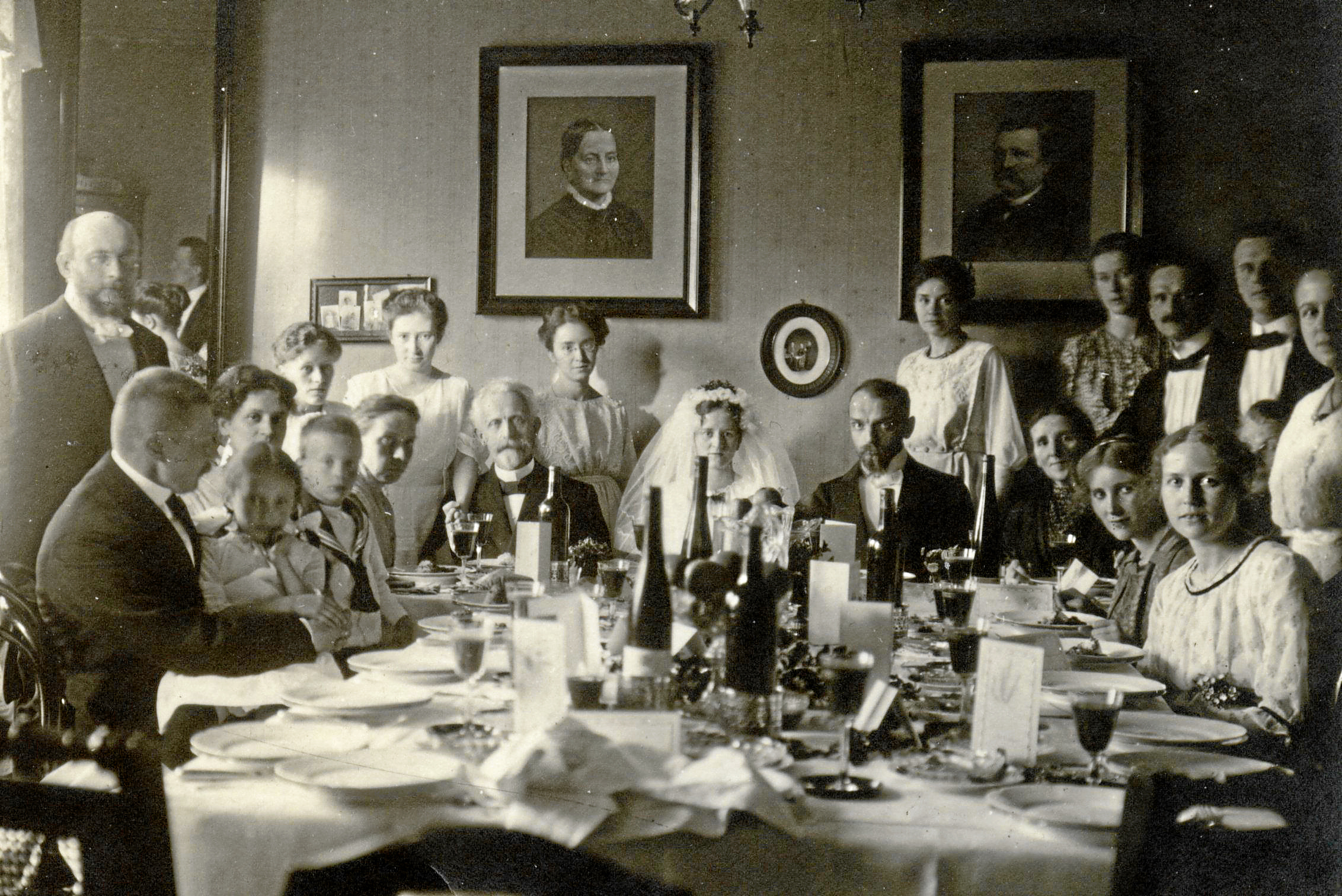
- 1919 A group photo of groom Heinrich Blasius during wedding with Margarethe Helene Puvogel
- Born: 9 August 1883; Berlin, Brandenburg, Prussia, Imperial Germany
- Died: 24 April 1970 (aged 86); Hamburg, West Germany
- Citizenship: German
- Education: University of Göttingen
- Known for: Blasius boundary layer Blasius theorem
- Scientific career
- Fields: Fluid mechanics and mechanical engineering
- Thesis: Boundary layers in liquids with low friction (1907)
- Doctoral advisor: Ludwig Prandtl

Paul Richard Heinrich Blasius (9 August 1883 – 24 April 1970) was a German physicist who specialized in fluid dynamics. He was the first PhD student of Ludwig Prandtl.

Heinrich Blasius provided a mathematical basis for boundary-layer drag but also showed as early as 1911 that the resistance to flow through smooth pipes could be expressed in terms of the Reynolds number for both laminar and turbulent flow. After six years in science he changed to Ingenieurschule Hamburg (today: University of Applied Sciences Hamburg) and became a Professor. On 1 April 1962 Heinrich Blasius celebrated his 50th anniversary in teaching. He was active in his field until he died on 24 April 1970.

One of his most notable contributions involves the first solution of the boundary-layer equations (derived by L. Prandtl) for the steady, incompressible, two-dimensional boundary-layer that forms on a semi-infinite plate that is held parallel to a constant unidirectional flow $U$.

== Correlations ==
First law of Blasius for turbulent Fanning friction factor:

$$f/2=0.039 Re^{-0.25} \,$$

Second law of Blasius for turbulent Fanning friction factor:

$$f/2=0.023 Re^{-0.22} \,$$

Law of Blasius for friction coefficient in turbulent pipe flow:

$$\lambda=0.3164 Re^{-0.25} \,$$

== See also ==
- Blasius function
