= Shell balance =

Method of analyzing fluid velocity across a flow

In fluid mechanics, a shell balance can be used to determine the velocity profile of a moving fluid, i.e., how fluid velocity changes with position across a flow cross section.

A "shell" is a differential element of the flow. By looking at the momentum and forces on one small portion, it is possible to integrate over the flow to see the larger picture of the flow as a whole. The balance is determining what goes into and out of the shell. Momentum is created within the shell through fluid entering and leaving the shell and by shear stress. In addition, there are pressure and gravitational forces on the shell. From this, it is possible to find a velocity for any point across the flow.

== Applications ==
Shell balances can be used in many situations. For example, flow in a pipe, the flow of multiple fluids around each other, or flow due to pressure difference. Although terms in the shell balance and boundary conditions will change, the basic set up and process is the same.

== Requirements for shell balance calculations ==
The fluid must exhibit:

- Laminar flow
- No bends or curves
- Steady state
- Two boundary conditions

Boundary Conditions are used to find constants of integration.

- Fluid - Solid Boundary: No-slip condition, the velocity of a liquid at a solid is equal to the velocity of the solid.
- Liquid - Gas Boundary: Shear stress = 0.
- Liquid - Liquid Boundary: Equal velocity and shear stress on both liquids.

== Performing shell balances ==
A fluid is flowing between and in contact with two horizontal surfaces of contact area A. A differential shell of height Δy is utilized (see diagram below).

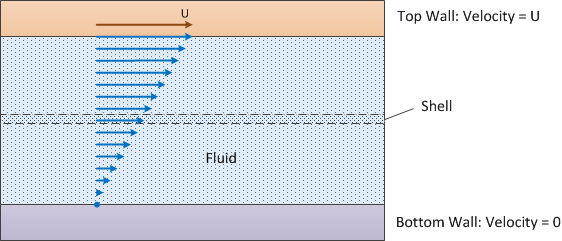
Diagram of the shell balance process in fluid mechanics

The top surface is moving at velocity U and the bottom surface is stationary.

- Density of fluid = ρ
- Viscosity of fluid = μ
- Velocity in x direction = $V_x$, shown by the diagonal line above. This is what a shell balance is solving for.

=== Conservation of momentum ===
- (Rate of momentum in) - (rate of momentum out) + (sum of all forces) = 0

To perform a shell balance, follow the following basic steps:

1. Find momentum from shear stress.(Momentum from Shear Stress Into System) - (Momentum from Shear Stress Out of System). Momentum from Shear Stress goes into the shell at y and leaves the system at y + Δy. Shear stress = τ_{yx}, area = A, momentum = τ_{yx}A.
2. Find momentum from the flow. Momentum flows into the system at x = 0 and out at x = L. The flow is steady state. Therefore, the momentum flow at x = 0 is equal to the moment of flow at x = L. Therefore, these cancel out.
3. Find gravity force on the shell.
4. Find pressure forces.
5. Plug into conservation of momentum and solve for τ_{yx}.
6. Apply Newton's law of viscosity for a Newtonian fluidτ_{yx} = -μ(dV_{x}/dy).
7. Integrate to find the equation for velocity and use Boundary Conditions to find constants of integration.

Boundary 1: Top Surface: y = 0 and V_{x} = U

Boundary 2: Bottom Surface: y = D and V_{x} = 0

== Resources ==
- "Problem Solutions in Transport Phenomena : Fluid Mechanics Problems".
- Harriott, Peter; W. McCabe; J. Smith (2004). Unit Operations of Chemical Engineering: Seventh Edition. McGraw-Hill Professional. pp. 68–132. ISBN 9780072848236.
