= Falkner–Skan boundary layer =

Boundary layer that forms on a wedge

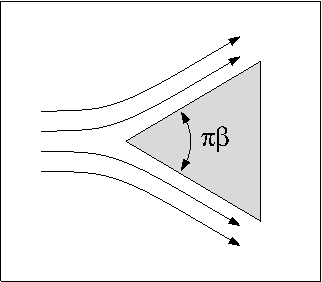
Wedge flow.

In fluid dynamics, the Falkner–Skan boundary layer (named after Victor Montague Falkner and Sylvia W. Skan) describes the steady two-dimensional laminar boundary layer that forms on a wedge, i.e. flows in which the plate is not parallel to the flow. It is also representative of flow on a flat plate with an imposed pressure gradient along the plate length, a situation often encountered in wind tunnel flow. It is a generalization of the flat plate Blasius boundary layer in which the pressure gradient along the plate is zero.

== Prandtl's boundary layer equations ==
The basis of the Falkner-Skan approach are the Prandtl boundary layer equations. Ludwig Prandtl simplified the equations for fluid flowing along a wall (wedge) by dividing the flow into two areas: one close to the wall dominated by viscosity, and one outside this near-wall boundary layer region where viscosity can be neglected without significant effects on the solution. This means that about half of the terms in the Navier-Stokes equations are negligible in near-wall boundary layer flows (except in a small region near the leading edge of the plate). This reduced set of equations are known as the Prandtl boundary layer equations. For steady incompressible flow with constant viscosity and density, these read:

Mass Continuity: $\dfrac{\partial u}{\partial x}+\dfrac{\partial v}{\partial y}=0$

$x$-Momentum: $u \dfrac{\partial u}{\partial x} + v \dfrac{\partial u}{\partial y} = - \dfrac{1}{\rho} \dfrac{\partial p}{\partial x} + {\nu} \dfrac{\partial^2 u}{\partial y^2}$

$y$-Momentum: $0 = - \dfrac{\partial p}{\partial y}$

Here the coordinate system is chosen with $x$ pointing parallel to the plate in the direction of the flow and the $y$ coordinate pointing towards the free stream, $u$ and $v$ are the $x$ and $y$ velocity components, $p$ is the pressure, $\rho$ is the density and $\nu$ is the kinematic viscosity.

A number of similarity solutions to these equations have been found for various types of flow. Falkner and Skan developed the similarity solution for the case of laminar flow along a wedge in 1930. The term similarity refers to the property that the velocity profiles at different positions in the flow look similar apart from scaling factors in the boundary layer thickness and a characteristic boundary layer velocity. These scaling factors reduce the partial differential equations to a set of relatively easily solved set of ordinary differential equations.

== Falkner–Skan equation - First order boundary layer ==
Falkner and Skan generalized the Blasius boundary layer by considering a wedge with an angle of $\pi \beta / 2$ from some uniform velocity field $U_0$. Falkner and Skan's first key assumption was that the pressure gradient term in the Prandtl x-momentum equation could be replaced by the differential form of the Bernoulli equation in the high Reynolds number limit. Thus:

$$-\dfrac{1}{\rho}\dfrac{\partial p}{\partial x} = u_e \dfrac{d u_e}{dx} \quad .$$

Here $u_e(x)$ is the velocity of at the boundary layer edge and is the solution the Euler equations (fluid dynamics) in the outer region.

Having made the Bernoulli equation substitution, Falkner and Skan pointed out that similarity solutions are obtained when the boundary layer thickness and velocity scaling factors are assumed to be simple power functions of x. That is, they assumed the velocity similarity scaling factor is given by:

$$u_e(x)= U_0 \left( \frac x L \right)^m \quad ,$$

where $L$ is the wedge length and m is a dimensionless constant. Falkner and Skan also assumed the boundary layer thickness scaling factor is proportional to:

$$\delta (x) \; = \; \sqrt{\frac{2\nu L}{U_0(m+1)}}\left( \frac x L \right)^{(1-m)/2} \quad .$$

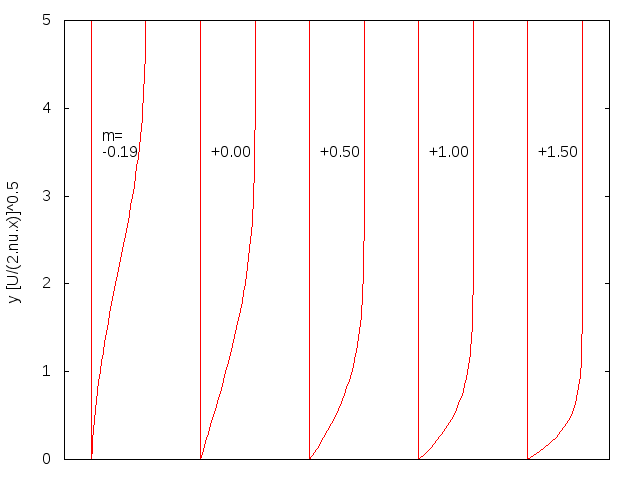
Falkner-Skan boundary layer profiles for selected values of $m$.

Mass conservation is automatically ensured when the Prandtl momentum boundary layer equations are solved using a stream function approach. The stream function, in terms of the scaling factors, is given by:

$$\psi(x,y) \; = \; u_e(x)\delta(x)f(\eta) \quad ,$$

where $\eta = {y}/{\delta (x)}$ and the velocities are given by:

$$u(x,y)\;  = \; \frac{{\partial \psi (x,y)}}{{\partial y}},\quad {\rm{and}}\quad v(x,y)\;  = \;  - \frac{{\partial \psi (x,y)}}{{\partial x}}\quad.$$

This means

$$\psi(x,y) \; = \;  \sqrt{\frac{2\nu U_0 L}{m+1}}\left( \frac x L \right)^{(m+1)/2} f(\eta) \quad .$$

The non-dimensionalized Prandtl x-momentum equation using the similarity length and velocity scaling factors together with the stream function based velocities results in an equation known as the Falkner–Skan equation and is given by:

$$f''' + f f'' + \beta \left[1-(f')^2 \right]=0  \quad ,$$

where each dash represents differentiation with respect to $\eta$ (Note that another equivalent equation with a different $\beta$ involving an $\alpha$ is sometimes used. This changes f and its derivatives but ultimately results in the same backed-out $u(x,y)$ and $v(x,y)$ solutions). This equation can be solved for certain $\beta$ as an ODE with boundary conditions:

$$f(0)=f'(0)=0, \quad f'(\infty)=1.$$

The wedge angle, after some manipulation, is given by:

$$\beta = \frac{2m}{m + 1} \quad.$$

The $m = \beta = 0$ case corresponds to the Blasius boundary layer solution. When $\beta=1$, the problem reduces to the Hiemenz flow. Here, m < 0 corresponds to an adverse pressure gradient (often resulting in boundary layer separation) while m > 0 represents a favorable pressure gradient. In 1937 Douglas Hartree showed that physical solutions to the Falkner–Skan equation exist only in the range $-0.090429\leq m \leq 2\ (-0.198838\leq\beta\leq 4/3)$. For more negative values of m, that is, for stronger adverse pressure gradients, all solutions satisfying the boundary conditions at η = 0 have the property that f(η) > 1 for a range of values of η. This is physically unacceptable because it implies that the velocity in the boundary layer is greater than in the main flow. Further details may be found in Wilcox (2007).

With the solution for f and its derivatives in hand, the Falkner and Skan velocities become:

$$u(x,y) = u_e(x)f' \quad ,$$

and

$$v(x,y) = -\sqrt {\frac {(m+1) \nu U_0 }{2 L}  \left( \frac x L \right)^{m-1}} \left(f+\frac{m-1}{m+1}\eta f' \right)\quad .$$

The Prandtl $y$-momentum equation can be rearranged to obtain the $y$-pressure gradient, ${\partial p}$/${\partial y}$, (this is the formula appropriate for the $\alpha$=1 and $\beta$=2m/(m+1) case) as

$$\frac{{x^2 }}{{u_e^2 \delta _1 }}\frac{1}{\rho }\frac{{\partial p}}{{\partial y}}\;  = \;  - \frac{1 }{{4 }}(m+1)(3m - 1)f'' + \frac{1 }{{4 }}(m+1)(1 - m)\eta f''' - \frac{1}{4}(m + 1)^2 ff' +
\frac{1}{4}(m - 1)^2 \eta f'^2  -  \frac{1}{4}(m + 1)(m - 1)\eta ff'' \quad  \quad ,$$

where the displacement thickness, $\delta_1$, for the Falkner-Skan profile is given by:

$$\delta_1 (x)= \left( \frac{2}{m+1}\right)^{1/2} \left( \frac{\nu x}{U}\right)^{1/2} \int_0^\infty (1-f') d\eta$$

and the shear stress acting at the wedge is given by

$$\tau_w (x)= \mu \left( \frac{m+1}{2}\right)^{1/2} \left( \frac{U^3}{\nu x}\right)^{1/2} f''(0)$$

== Compressible Falkner–Skan boundary layer ==
Here Falkner–Skan boundary layer with a specified specific enthalpy $h$ at the wall is studied. The density $\rho$, viscosity $\mu$ and thermal conductivity $\kappa$ are no longer constant here. In the low Mach number approximation, the equation for conservation of mass, momentum and energy become

$$\begin{align}
\frac{\partial (\rho u)}{\partial x} + \frac{\partial (\rho v)}{\partial y} & = 0,\\
\left(u \frac{\partial u}{\partial x} + v \frac{\partial u}{\partial y} \right) & = - \frac{1}{\rho} \frac{dp}{dx} + \frac{1}{\rho}\frac{\partial }{\partial y} \left(\mu\frac{\partial u}{\partial y}\right),\\
\rho \left(u \frac{\partial h}{\partial x} + v \frac{\partial h}{\partial y} \right) &=  \frac{\partial }{\partial y} \left(\frac{\mu}{Pr} \frac{\partial h}{\partial y} \right)
\end{align}$$

where $Pr=c_{p_\infty}\mu_\infty/\kappa_\infty$ is the Prandtl number with suffix $\infty$ representing properties evaluated at infinity. The boundary conditions become

$$u = v = h - h_w(x) = 0 \ \text{for} \ y=0$$,
$$u -U = h - h_\infty =0 \ \text{for} \ y=\infty \ \text{or} \ x=0$$.

Unlike the incompressible boundary layer, similarity solution can exists for only if the transformation

$$x\rightarrow c^2 x, \quad y\rightarrow cy, \quad u\rightarrow u, \quad v\rightarrow \frac{v}{c}, \quad h\rightarrow h, \quad \rho\rightarrow \rho, \quad \mu\rightarrow \mu$$

holds and this is possible only if $h_w=\text{constant}$.

=== Howarth transformation ===
Introducing the self-similar variables using Howarth–Dorodnitsyn transformation

$$\eta = \sqrt{\frac{U_o(m+1)}{2\nu_\infty L^m}} x^{\frac{m-1}{2}}\int_0^y \frac{\rho}{\rho_\infty} dy, \quad \psi = \sqrt{\frac{2 U_o \nu_\infty}{(m+1) L^m}} x^{\frac{m+1}{2}} f(\eta), \quad \tilde h(\eta) = \frac{h}{h_\infty}, \quad \tilde h_w = \frac{h_w}{h_\infty}, \quad \tilde \rho = \frac{\rho}{\rho_\infty}, \quad \tilde \mu = \frac{\mu}{\mu_\infty}$$

the equations reduce to

$$\begin{align}
(\tilde\rho\tilde \mu f'')' + ff'' + \beta [\tilde h - (f')^2] =0, \\
(\tilde\rho\tilde\mu \tilde h')' + Prf\tilde h'  =0
\end{align}$$

The equation can be solved once $\tilde \rho = \tilde \rho(\tilde h),\ \tilde \mu = \tilde \mu(\tilde h)$ are specified. The boundary conditions are

$$f(0)=f'(0)=\theta(0)-\tilde h_w=f'(\infty)-1=\tilde h(\infty)-1=0.$$

The commonly used expressions for air are $\gamma = 1.4, \ Pr = 0.7, \ \tilde\rho = \tilde h^{-1}, \ \tilde\mu = \tilde h^{2/3}$. If $c_p$ is constant, then $\tilde h=\tilde \theta = T/T_\infty$.

== See also ==
- Blasius boundary layer
