= Blasius theorem =

Result in fluid mechanics

In fluid dynamics, Blasius theorem states that the force experienced by a two-dimensional fixed body in a steady irrotational flow is given by

$$F_x-iF_y = \frac{i\rho}{2} \oint_C \left(\frac{\mathrm{d}w}{\mathrm{d}z}\right)^2\mathrm{d}z$$

and the moment about the origin experienced by the body is given by

$$M=\Re\left\{-\frac{\rho}{2}\oint_C z \left(\frac{\mathrm{d}w}{\mathrm{d}z}\right)^2\mathrm{d}z\right\}.$$

Here,

- $(F_x,F_y)$ is the force acting on the body,
- $\rho$ is the density of the fluid,
- $C$ is the contour flush around the body,
- $w=\phi+ i\psi$ is the complex potential ($\phi$ is the velocity potential, $\psi$ is the stream function),
- ${\mathrm{d}w}/{\mathrm{d}z} = u_x-i u_y$ is the complex velocity ($(u_x,u_y)$ is the velocity vector),
- $z=x+iy$ is the complex variable ($(x,y)$ is the position vector),
- $\Re$ is the real part of the complex number, and
- $M$ is the moment about the coordinate origin acting on the body.

The first formula is sometimes called Blasius–Chaplygin formula.

The theorem is named after Paul Richard Heinrich Blasius, who derived it in 1911. The Kutta–Joukowski theorem directly follows from this theorem.
