= No-slip condition =

Concept in fluid dynamics

In fluid dynamics, the no-slip condition is a boundary condition which enforces that at a solid boundary, a viscous fluid attains zero bulk velocity. This boundary condition was first proposed by Osborne Reynolds, who observed this behaviour while performing his influential pipe flow experiments. The form of this boundary condition is an example of a Dirichlet boundary condition.

In the majority of fluid flows relevant to fluids engineering, the no-slip condition is generally utilised at solid boundaries. This condition often fails for systems which exhibit non-Newtonian behaviour. Fluids which this condition fails includes common food-stuffs which contain a high fat content, such as mayonnaise or melted cheese.

== Physical justification ==
The no-slip condition is an empirical assumption that has been useful in modelling many macroscopic experiments. It was one of three alternatives that were the subject of contention in the 19th century, with the other two being the stagnant-layer (a thin layer of stationary fluid on which the rest of the fluid flows) and the partial slip (a finite relative velocity between solid and fluid) boundary conditions. However, by the start of the 20th century it became generally accepted that slip, if it did exist, was too small to be measured. The stagnant layer was deemed too thin, and the partial slip was considered to have negligible effect on the macroscopic scale.

While not derived from first principles, two possible mechanisms have been offered to explain the no-slip behaviour, with one or the other being dominant under different conditions. The first contends that the surface roughness is responsible for bringing the fluid to rest through viscous dissipation past the surface irregularities. The second is related to the attraction of fluid molecules to the surface. Particles close to a surface do not move along with a flow when adhesion is stronger than cohesion. At the fluid-solid interface, the force of attraction between the fluid particles and solid particles (adhesive forces) is greater than that between the fluid particles (cohesive forces). This force imbalance causes the fluid velocity to be zero adjacent to the solid surface, with the velocity approaching that of the stream as distance from the surface increases.

When a fluid is at rest, its molecules move constantly with a random velocity. When the fluid begins to flow, an average flow velocity, sometimes called the bulk velocity, is added to the random motion. At the boundary between the fluid and a solid surface, the attraction between the fluid molecules and the surface atoms is strong enough to slow the bulk velocity to zero. Consequently, the bulk velocity of the fluid decreases from its value away from the wall to zero at the wall.

== Slip behaviour ==
As the no-slip condition was an empirical observation, there are physical scenarios in which it fails. For sufficiently rarefied flows, including flows of high altitude atmospheric gases and for microscale flows, the no-slip condition is inaccurate. For such examples, this change is driven by an increasing Knudsen number, which implies increasing rarefaction, and gradual failure of the continuum approximation. The first-order expression, which is often used to model fluid slip in sufficiently rarefied flows, is expressed as
$$u - u_\text{Wall} = C\ell \frac{\partial u}{\partial n},$$
where $n$ is the coordinate normal to the wall, $\ell$ is the mean free path and $C$ is some constant known as the slip coefficient, which is approximately of order 1 for most materials of microscale roughness. The first derivation of the value for the slip coefficient, C, was given by James Clerk Maxwell through methods the kinetic theory of gases, where point particles were assumed to collide with the wall diffusively with a probability $\alpha$, leading to the relation
$$C = \frac{2-\alpha}{\alpha}$$
which reduces to 1 for purely diffusive collisions. Extensions beyond this first-order (Maxwell slip) approximation have been performed by scholars such as Carlo Cercignani along with Sydney Chapman and Thomas Cowling.

Alternatively, for the first order approximation, one may introduce $\beta = C\ell$ as the slip length. Some highly hydrophobic surfaces, such as carbon nanotubes with added radicals, have also been observed to have a nonzero but nanoscale slip length.

While the no-slip condition is used almost universally in modeling of viscous flows, it is sometimes neglected in favor of the 'no-penetration condition' (where the fluid velocity normal to the wall is set to the wall velocity in this direction, but the fluid velocity parallel to the wall is unrestricted) in elementary analyses of inviscid flow, where the effect of boundary layers is neglected.

The no-slip condition poses a problem in viscous flow theory at contact lines: places where an interface between two fluids meets a solid boundary. Here, the no-slip boundary condition implies that the position of the contact line does not move, which is not observed in reality. Analysis of a moving contact line with the no slip condition results in infinite stresses that can't be integrated over. The rate of movement of the contact line is believed to be dependent on the angle the contact line makes with the solid boundary, but the mechanism behind this is not yet fully understood.

== See also ==
- Boundary layer
- Wall Slip
- Wind gradient
- Shear stress
- Shell balance
