= Frank T. Smith =

English applied mathematician

Frank Smith FRS
- Born: Frank Thomas Smith; 24 February 1948 (age 78)
- Education: Bournemouth Grammar School
- Alma mater: University of Oxford (BA, DPhil)
- Spouse: Valerie Sheila Hearn (m. 1972)
- Children: 3
- Scientific career
- Fields: Fluid mechanics
- Workplaces: University College London
- Thesis: Theoretical and experimental study of airflow past a porous surface with strong blowing, and two related problems (1972)
- Academic advisors: David Spence
- Doctoral students: Hannah Fry
- Website: profiles.ucl.ac.uk/2282-frank-smith

Frank Thomas Smith FRS (born 24 February 1948) is Emeritus Goldsmid Professor in the department of mathematics in the University College London, a specialist in fluid mechanics.

== Education ==
Smith was educated at Bournemouth Grammar School and the University of Oxford where he was awarded a Bachelor of Arts (BA) degree as an undergraduate student of Jesus College, Oxford followed by a Doctor of Philosophy (DPhil) degree in 1972 for research supervised by David Spence, John Ockendon and Keith Stewartson.

== Career and research ==
Smith made significant contributions to triple-deck theory applied to boundary layer flows, separated flows, biofluid mechanics, and skimming-stone problem. Smith served as director of Lighthill Institute of Mathematical Sciences (LIMS).

Smith supervised ten successful PhD students including Hannah Fry and Jitesh Gajjar.

=== Awards and honours ===
Smith was elected a Fellow of the Royal Society (FRS) in 1984.
