= Von Kármán swirling flow =

Flow created by a uniformly rotating infinitely long plate disk

Von Kármán swirling flow is a flow created by a uniformly rotating infinitely long plane disk, named after Theodore von Kármán who solved the problem in 1921. The rotating disk acts as a fluid pump and is used as a model for centrifugal fans or compressors. This flow is classified under the category of steady flows in which vorticity generated at a solid surface is prevented from diffusing far away by an opposing convection, the other examples being the Blasius boundary layer with suction, stagnation point flow etc.

== Flow description ==
Consider a planar disk of infinite radius rotating at a constant angular velocity $\Omega$ in fluid which is initially at rest everywhere. Near to the surface, the fluid is being turned by the disk, due to friction, which then causes centrifugal forces which move the fluid outwards. This outward radial motion of the fluid near the disk must be accompanied by an inward axial motion of the fluid towards the disk to conserve mass. Theodore von Kármán noticed that the governing equations and the boundary conditions allow a solution such that $u/r, v/r$ and $w$ are functions of $z$ only, where $(u,v,w)$ are the velocity components in cylindrical $(r,\theta,z)$ coordinate with $r=0$ being the axis of rotation and $z=0$ represents the plane disk. Due to symmetry, pressure of the fluid can depend only on radial and axial coordinate $p=p(r,z)$. Then the continuity equation and the incompressible Navier–Stokes equations reduce to

$$\begin{align}
& \frac{2u} r + \frac{dw}{dz} = 0 \\[8pt]
& \left(\frac{u}{r}\right)^2 - \left(\frac{v}{r}\right)^2 + w \frac{d(u/r)}{dz} = - \frac{1}{\rho} \frac{\partial p}{\partial r} + \nu \frac{d^2(u/r)}{dz^2} \\[8pt]
& \frac{2uv}{r^2} + w \frac{d(v/r)}{dz} = \nu \frac{d^2(v/r)}{dz^2} \\[8pt]
& w \frac{dw}{dz} = -\frac{1}{\rho} \frac{\partial p}{\partial z} + \nu \frac{d^2 w}{dz^2}  \qquad \Rightarrow \qquad \frac p \rho = \nu \frac{dw}{dz} - \frac{1}{2} w^2 + f(r)
\end{align}$$

where $\nu$ is the kinematic viscosity.

== No rotation at infinity ==
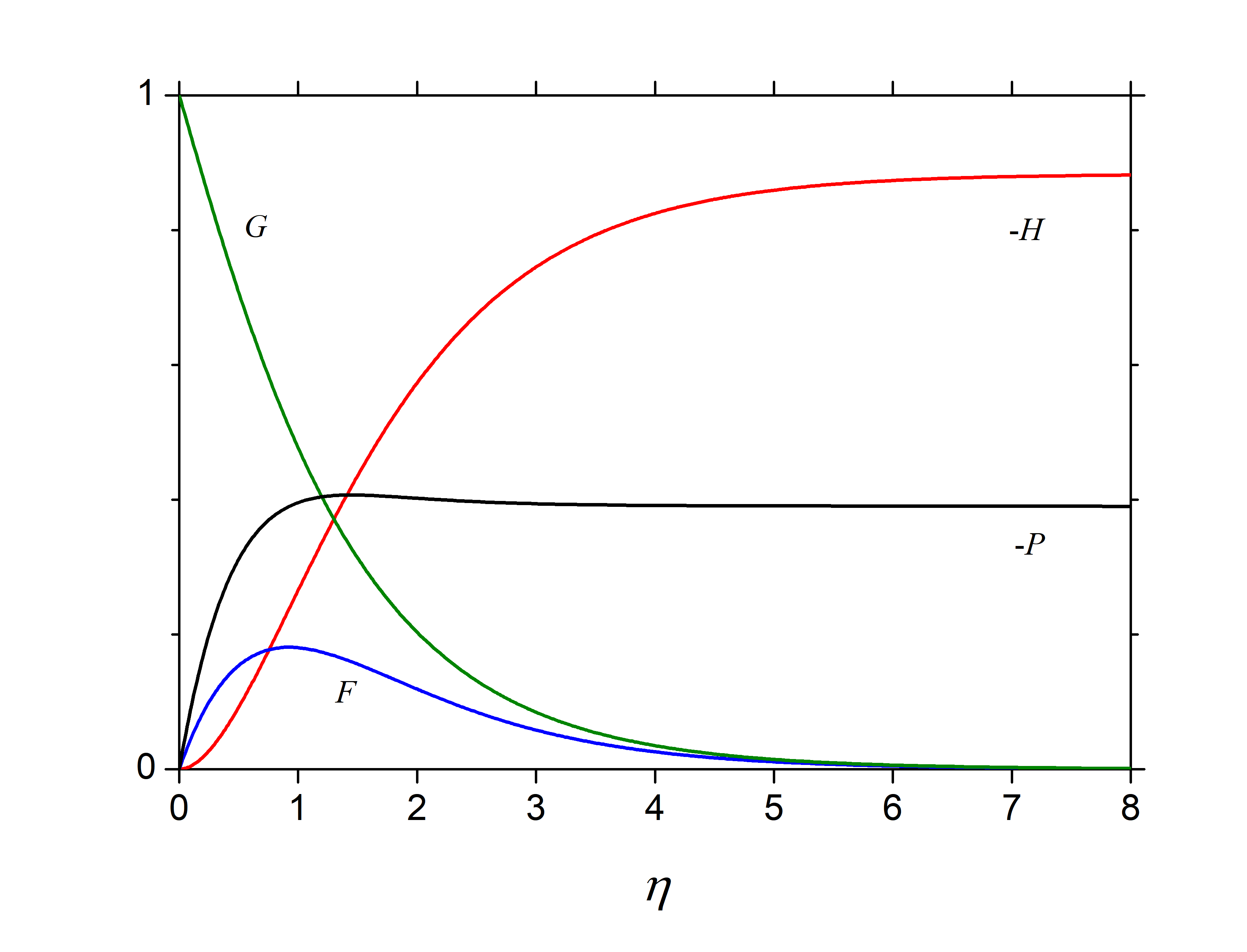
The Von Karman Swirling Flow similarity velocities and pressure for an infinite rotating disk as a function of the distance above the disk.

Since there is no rotation at large $z\rightarrow \infty$, $p(r,z)$ becomes independent of $r$ resulting in $p =p(z)$. Hence $f(r)=\text{constant}$ and $\partial p/\partial r =0$.

Here the boundary conditions for the fluid $z>0$ are

$$u =0, \quad v = \Omega r, \quad  w =0, \quad p = p_0 \quad \text{ for } z=0$$
$$u =0, \quad v = 0\quad \text{ for } z\rightarrow \infty$$

Self-similar solution is obtained by introducing following transformation,

$$\eta = \sqrt{\frac{\Omega}{\nu}}z, \quad u = r \Omega F(\eta), \quad v = r \Omega G(\eta) , \quad w = \sqrt{\nu \Omega} H(\eta) , \quad p = p_0 + \rho \nu \Omega P(\eta) ,$$

where $\rho$ is the fluid density.

The self-similar equations are

$$\begin{align}
2F + H' & = 0 \\
F^2 - G^2 + F'H & = F'' \\
2FG + G'H & = G'' \\
P' + HH' - H'' & = 0
\end{align}$$

with boundary conditions for the fluid $\eta>0$ are

$$F =0, \quad G = 1, \quad H =0, \quad P = 0 \quad \text{ for } \eta=0$$
$$F =0, \quad G = 0\quad \text{ for } \eta\rightarrow \infty$$

The coupled ordinary differential equations need to be solved numerically and an accurate solution is given by Cochran. The inflow axial velocity at infinity obtained from the numerical integration is $w = -0.886 \sqrt{\nu \Omega}$, so the total outflowing volume flux across a cylindrical surface of radius $r$ is $0.886 \pi r^2 \sqrt{\nu \Omega}$. The tangential stress on the disk is $\sigma_{z\varphi} = \mu (\partial v/\partial z)_{z=0} =\rho \sqrt{\nu \Omega^3} r G'(0)$. Neglecting edge effects, the torque exerted by the fluid on the disk with large ($R \gg \sqrt{\nu/\Omega}$) but finite radius $R$ is

$$T = 2 \int_0^R 2 \pi r^2 \sigma_{r\theta} \, dr = \pi R^4 \rho \sqrt{\nu\Omega^3} G'(0).$$

The factor $2$ is added to account for both sides of the disk. From numerical solution, torque is given by $T = - 1.94 R^4 \rho \sqrt{\nu\Omega^3}$. The torque predicted by the theory is in excellent agreement with the experiment on large disks up to the Reynolds number of about $Re=R^2 \Omega/\nu = 3\times 10^5$, the flow becomes turbulent at high Reynolds number.

== Rigid body rotation at infinity ==
This problem was addressed by George Keith Batchelor(1951). Let $\Gamma$ be the angular velocity at infinity. Now the pressure at $z\rightarrow\infty$ is $\frac{1}{2}\rho \Gamma^2 r^2$. Hence $f(r)=\frac{1}{2}\rho \Gamma^2 r^2$ and $\partial p/\partial r =\Gamma^2$.
Then the boundary conditions for the fluid $z>0$ are

$$u =0, \quad v = \Omega r ,\quad  w =0 \quad \text{ for } z=0$$
$$u =0, \quad v = \Gamma r \quad \text{for } z\rightarrow \infty$$

Self-similar solution is obtained by introducing following transformation,

$$\eta = \sqrt{\frac{\Omega}{\nu}}z, \quad \gamma = \frac{\Gamma}{\Omega}, \quad u = r \Omega F(\eta), \quad v = r \Omega G(\eta) , \quad w = \sqrt{\nu \Omega} H(\eta) .$$

The self-similar equations are

$$\begin{align}
2F + H' & = 0 \\[3pt]
F^2 - G^2 + F'H & = F''- \gamma^2 \\[3pt]
2FG + G'H & = G''
\end{align}$$

with boundary conditions for the fluid $\eta>0$ is

$$F =0, \quad G = 1, \quad H =0 \quad \text{ for } \eta=0$$
$$F =0, \quad G = \gamma\quad \text{  for  } \eta\rightarrow \infty$$

The solution is easy to obtain only for $\gamma>0$ i.e., the fluid at infinity rotates in the same sense as the plate. For $\gamma<0$, the solution is more complex, in the sense that many-solution branches occur. Evans(1969) obtained solution for the range $-1.35<\gamma<-0.61$. Zandbergen and Dijkstra showed that the solution exhibits a square root singularity as $\gamma^-\rightarrow -0.16053876$ and found a second-solution branch merging with the solution found for $\gamma\rightarrow -0.16053876$. The solution of the second branch is continued till $\gamma^-\rightarrow 0.07452563$, at which point, a third-solution branch is found to emerge. They also discovered an infinity of solution branches around the point $\gamma^-\rightarrow 0$. Bodoyni(1975) calculated solutions for large negative $\gamma$, showed that the solution breaks down at $\gamma^-=-1.436$. If the rotating plate is allowed to have uniform suction velocity at the plate, then meaningful solution can be obtained for $\gamma\leq-0.2$.

For $0<\gamma<\infty, \ \gamma\neq 1$ ($\gamma=1$ represents solid body rotation, the whole fluid rotates at the same speed) the solution reaches the solid body rotation at infinity in an oscillating manner from the plate. The axial velocity is negative $w<0$ for $0\leq\gamma<1$ and positive $w>0$ for $1<\gamma<\infty$. There is an explicit solution when $|\gamma-1| \ll 1$.

=== Nearly rotating at the same speed, $|\gamma-1|\ll 1$ ===
Since both boundary conditions for $G$ are almost equal to one, one would expect the solution for $G$ to slightly deviate from unity. The corresponding scales for $F$ and $H$ can be derived from the self-similar equations. Therefore,

$$G = 1+ \hat G, \quad H = \hat H, \quad F = \hat F \qquad |\hat F|,|\hat G|,|\hat H|\ll 1$$

To the first order approximation(neglecting $\hat F^2,\hat G^2, \hat H^2$), the self-similar equation becomes

$$\begin{align}
2\hat F + \hat H' & = 0 \\
1 + 2\hat G & = \gamma^2 -\hat F'' \\
2\hat F & = \hat G''
\end{align}$$

with exact solutions

$$\begin{align}
F(\eta) &= - (\gamma-1) e^{-\eta} \sin\eta, \\
G(\eta) &= 1+(\gamma-1) (1-e^{-\eta}\cos\eta),\\
H(\eta) &= (\gamma-1) [1-e^{-\eta} (\sin\eta + \cos\eta)].
\end{align}$$

These solution are similar to an Ekman layer solution.

=== Non-Axisymmetric solutions ===
The flow accepts a non-axisymmetric solution with axisymmetric boundary conditions discovered by Hewitt, Duck and Foster. Defining

$\eta = \sqrt{\frac{\Omega}{\nu}}z, \quad \gamma = \frac{\Gamma}{\Omega}, \quad u = r \Omega [f'(\eta) + \phi(\eta)\cos 2\theta], \quad v=r\Omega[g(\eta)-\phi(\eta)\sin 2\theta], \quad w = -2\sqrt{\nu\Omega}f(\eta),$

and the governing equations are

$$\begin{align}
f'''+2ff''-f'^2-\phi^2+g^2&=\gamma^2,\\
g''+2(fg'-f'g)&=0,\\
\phi''+2(f\phi'-f'\phi)&=0,
\end{align}$$

with boundary conditions

$$f(0)=f'(0)=\phi(0)=g(0)-1=f'(\infty)=\phi(\infty)=g(\infty)-\gamma=0.$$

The solution is found to exist from numerical integration for $-0.14485\leq\gamma\leq0$.

== Bödewadt flow ==
Bödewadt flow describes the flow when a stationary disk is placed in a rotating fluid.

== Two rotating coaxial disks ==
This problem was addressed by George Keith Batchelor(1951), Keith Stewartson(1952) and many other researchers. Here the solution is not simple, because of the additional length scale imposed in the problem i.e., the distance $h$ between the two disks. In addition, the uniqueness and existence of a steady solution are also depend on the corresponding Reynolds number $Re = \Omega h^2/\nu$.
Then the boundary conditions for the fluid $0<z<h$ are

$$u =0, \quad v = \Omega r,\quad  w =0 \quad \text{ for } z=0$$
$$u =0, \quad v = \Gamma r, \quad w=0 \quad \text{for } z=h.$$

In terms of $\eta$, the upper wall location is simply $\eta=\sqrt{\Omega/\nu}h=Re^{1/2}$. Thus, instead of the scalings

$$\begin{align}
\eta=\sqrt{\frac{\Omega}{\nu}}z, \quad \gamma=\frac{\Gamma}{\Omega}, \quad u = r\Omega F'(\eta), \quad v= r\Omega G(\eta), \quad w =-2\sqrt{\nu \Omega}F(\eta)
\end{align}$$

used before, it is convenient to introduce following transformation,

$$\begin{align}
\xi = Re^{-1/2} \eta, \quad f = Re^{-1/2} F, \quad g = G
\end{align}$$

so that the governing equations become

$$\begin{align}
Re^{-1} f''' + 2ff''-f'^2 + g^2 = \lambda,\\
Re^{-1} g'' + 2(fg'-f'g)=0
\end{align}$$

with six boundary conditions

$$f' =0, \quad g = 1 ,\quad  f =0 \quad \text{ for } \xi=0$$
$$f' =0, \quad g = \gamma, \quad f=0 \quad \text{for } \xi=1.$$

and the pressure is given by

$$\frac{p-p_o}{\rho} = \frac{1}{2}\lambda r^2 \Omega^2 - 2\nu\Omega (Re f^2 + f').$$

Here boundary conditions are six because pressure is not known either at the top or bottom wall; $\lambda$ is to be obtained as part of solution. For large Reynolds number $Re\gg 1$, Batchelor argued that the fluid in the core would rotate at a constant velocity, flanked by two boundary layers at each disk for $\gamma\geq 0$ and there would be two uniform counter-rotating flow of thickness $\xi=1/2$ for $\gamma=-1$. However, Stewartson predicted that for $\gamma=0,-1$ the fluid in the core would not rotate at $Re\gg 1$, but just left with two boundary layers at each disk. It turns out, Stewartson predictions were correct (see Stewartson layer).

There is also an exact solution if the two disks are rotating about different axes but for $\gamma=1$.

== Applications ==
Experimental visualization of a methane/air spiral diffusion flame in a von Kármán swirling flow generated by a rotating porous disk burner (false color).

Von Kármán swirling flow finds its applications in wide range of fields, which includes rotating machines, filtering systems, computer storage devices, heat transfer and mass transfer applications, combustion-related problems, planetary formations, geophysical applications etc.

== Bibliography ==
- Von Kármán, Theodore (1921). "Über laminare und turbulente Reibung". Zeitschrift für Angewandte Mathematik und Mechanik. 1 (4): 233–252. Bibcode:1921ZaMM....1..233K. doi:10.1002/zamm.19210010401.
- Batchelor, George Keith (1951). "Note on a class of solutions of the Navier-Stokes equations representing steady rotationally-symmetric flow". The Quarterly Journal of Mechanics and Applied Mathematics. 4: 29–41. doi:10.1093/qjmam/4.1.29.
- Stewartson, K. (1953). "On the flow between two rotating coaxial disks". Mathematical Proceedings of the Cambridge Philosophical Society. 49 (2): 333–341. Bibcode:1953PCPS...49..333S. doi:10.1017/S0305004100028437. S2CID 122805153.
- Batchelor, George Keith (2000). An introduction to fluid dynamics. Cambridge university press. ISBN 978-0521663960.
- Landau, Lev D (1987). Fluid Mechanics. Butterworth-Heinenann. ISBN 978-0750627672.
- Schlichting, Hermann (1960). Boundary-Layer Theory. New York: McGraw-hill.
- Schlichting, Hermann and Gersten, Klaus (2017). Boundary-Layer Theory. Springer. ISBN 978-3662529171.
