= Invariants of tensors =

Concept in multilinear algebra and representation theory

In mathematics, in the fields of multilinear algebra and representation theory, the principal invariants of the second rank tensor $\mathbf{A}$ are the coefficients of the characteristic polynomial

$$\ p(\lambda)=\det (\mathbf{A}-\lambda \mathbf{I})$$,

where $\mathbf{I}$ is the identity operator and $\lambda_i \in\mathbb{C}$ are the roots of the polynomial $p$ and the eigenvalues of $\mathbf{A}$.

More broadly, any scalar-valued function $f(\mathbf{A})$ is an invariant of $\mathbf{A}$ if and only if $f(\mathbf{Q}\mathbf{A}\mathbf{Q}^T)=f(\mathbf{A})$ for all orthogonal $\mathbf{Q}$. This means that a formula expressing an invariant in terms of components, $A_{ij}$, will give the same result for all Cartesian bases. For example, even though individual diagonal components of $\mathbf{A}$ will change with a change in basis, the sum of diagonal components will not change.

The principal invariants do not change with rotations of the coordinate system (they are objective, or in more modern terminology, satisfy the principle of material frame-indifference) and any function of the principal invariants is also objective.

== Calculation of the invariants of rank two tensors ==
In a majority of engineering applications, the principal invariants of (rank two) tensors of dimension three are sought, such as those for the right Cauchy-Green deformation tensor $\mathbf{C}$ which has the eigenvalues $\lambda_1^2$, $\lambda_2^2$, and $\lambda_3^2$. Where $\lambda_1$, $\lambda_2$, and $\lambda_3$ are the principal stretches, i.e. the eigenvalues of $\mathbf{U}=\sqrt{\mathbf{C}}$.

=== Principal invariants ===
For such tensors, the principal invariants are given by:

$$\begin{align}
I_1 &= \operatorname{tr}\mathbf{A} = A_{11}+A_{22}+A_{33} = \lambda_1+\lambda_2+\lambda_3 \\
I_2 &= \frac{1}{2} \left[ (\operatorname{tr}\mathbf{A})^2-\operatorname{tr}( \mathbf{A}^2) \right] = A_{11}A_{22}+A_{22}A_{33}+A_{11}A_{33}-A_{12}A_{21}-A_{23}A_{32}-A_{13}A_{31} = \lambda_1 \lambda_2 + \lambda_1 \lambda_3 + \lambda_2 \lambda_3 \\
I_3 &= \det \mathbf{A}=  -A_{13} A_{22} A_{31} + A_{12} A_{23} A_{31} + A_{13} A_{21} A_{32} - A_{11} A_{23} A_{32} - A_{12} A_{21} A_{33} +   A_{11} A_{22} A_{33} = \lambda_1 \lambda_2 \lambda_3
\end{align}$$

For symmetric tensors, these definitions are reduced.

The correspondence between the principal invariants and the characteristic polynomial of a tensor, in tandem with the Cayley–Hamilton theorem reveals that

$$\ \mathbf{A}^3 - I_1 \mathbf{A}^2 +I_2 \mathbf{A} -I_3 \mathbf{I}= 0$$

where $\mathbf{I}$ is the second-order identity tensor.

=== Main invariants ===
In addition to the principal invariants listed above, it is also possible to introduce the notion of main invariants

$$\begin{align}
J_1 &= \lambda_1 + \lambda_2 + \lambda_3 = I_1 \\
J_2 &= \lambda_1^2 + \lambda_2^2 + \lambda_3^2 = I_1^2 - 2 I_2   \\
J_3 &= \lambda_1^3 + \lambda_2^3 + \lambda_3^3 = I_1^3 - 3 I_1 I_2 + 3 I_3
\end{align}$$

which are functions of the principal invariants above. These are the coefficients of the characteristic polynomial of the deviator $\mathbf{A} - (\mathrm{tr}(\mathbf{A})/3)\mathbf{I}$, such that it is traceless. The separation of a tensor into a component that is a multiple of the identity and a traceless component is standard in hydrodynamics, where the former is called isotropic, providing the modified pressure, and the latter is called deviatoric, providing shear effects. Note that $J_1=I_1$ only by convention as the deviator of any tensor has by definition zero trace.

=== Mixed invariants ===
Furthermore, mixed invariants between pairs of rank two tensors may also be defined.

=== Invariants of higher dimension ===
These may be extracted by evaluating the characteristic polynomial directly, using the Faddeev-LeVerrier algorithm for example.

== Calculation of the invariants of higher rank tensors ==
The invariants of rank three, four, and higher order tensors may also be determined.

== Engineering applications ==
A scalar function $f$ that depends entirely on the principal invariants of a tensor is objective, i.e., independent of rotations of the coordinate system. This property is commonly used in formulating closed-form expressions for the strain energy density, or Helmholtz free energy, of a nonlinear material possessing isotropic symmetry.

This technique was first introduced into isotropic turbulence by Howard P. Robertson in 1940 where he was able to derive Kármán–Howarth equation from the invariant principle. George Batchelor and Subrahmanyan Chandrasekhar exploited this technique and developed an extended treatment for axisymmetric turbulence.

=== Invariants of non-symmetric tensors ===
A real tensor $\mathbf{A}$ in 3D (i.e., one with a 3x3 component matrix) has as many as six independent invariants, three being the invariants of its symmetric part and three characterizing the orientation of the axial vector of the skew-symmetric part relative to the principal directions of the symmetric part. For example, if the Cartesian components of $\mathbf{A}$ are

$$[A] = \begin{bmatrix}
931 & 5480 & -717\\
-5120 & 1650 & 1090\\
1533  & -610 & 1169
\end{bmatrix},$$

the first step would be to evaluate the axial vector $\mathbf{w}$ associated with the skew-symmetric part. Specifically, the axial vector has components

$$\begin{align}
w_1&=\frac{A_{32}-A_{23}}{2}=-850\\
w_2&=\frac{A_{13}-A_{31}}{2}=-1125\\
w_3&=\frac{A_{21}-A_{12}}{2}=-5300
\end{align}$$

The next step finds the principal values of the symmetric part of $\mathbf{A}$. Even though the eigenvalues of a real non-symmetric tensor might be complex, the eigenvalues of its symmetric part will always be real and therefore can be ordered from largest to smallest. The corresponding orthonormal principal basis directions can be assigned senses to ensure that the axial vector $\mathbf{w}$ points within the first octant. With respect to that special basis, the components of $\mathbf{A}$ are

$$[A'] = \begin{bmatrix}
1875 & -2500 & 3125\\
2500 & 1250  & -3750\\
-3125 & 3750 & 625
\end{bmatrix},$$

The first three invariants of $\mathbf{A}$ are the diagonal components of this matrix: $a_1=A'_{11}=1875 , a_2=A'_{22}=1250, a_3=A'_{33}=625$ (equal to the ordered principal values of the tensor's symmetric part). The remaining three invariants are the axial vector's components in this basis: $w'_1=A'_{32}=3750, w'_2=A'_{13}=3125, w'_3=A'_{21}=2500$. Note: the magnitude of the axial vector, $\sqrt{\mathbf{w}\cdot\mathbf{w}}$, is the sole invariant of the skew part of $\mathbf{A}$, whereas these distinct three invariants characterize (in a sense) "alignment" between the symmetric and skew parts of $\mathbf{A}$. Incidentally, it is a myth that a tensor is positive definite if its eigenvalues are positive. Instead, it is positive definite if and only if the eigenvalues of its symmetric part are positive.

== See also ==
- Symmetric polynomial
- Elementary symmetric polynomial
- Newton's identities
- Invariant theory
