= Alan B. Tayler =

British applied mathematician

Alan Tayler CBE
- Born: Alan Breach Tayler; 5 September 1931; Mitcham, Surrey
- Died: 29 January 1995 (aged 63); Ducklington, Oxfordshire
- Education: King's College School
- Alma mater: University of Oxford
- Spouse: June Earp (m. 1955–1995)
- Awards: IMA Gold Medal (1982)
- Scientific career
- Fields: Applied mathematics
- Institutions: University of Oxford
- Thesis: Problems in Compressible Flow (1959)
- Doctoral advisor: George Temple
- Doctoral students: John Ockendon

Alan Breach Tayler CBE (1931–1995) was a British applied mathematician and pioneer of "industrial mathematics". He was a Founding Fellow of St Catherine's College, Oxford (1959-1995), the initiator of the Oxford Study Groups with Industry in 1968 (which developed into the European Study Groups with Industry), a driving force behind the foundation of the European Consortium for Mathematics in Industry (ECMI) in 1985 and President of ECMI (1989), and the first Director of the Oxford Centre for Industrial and Applied Mathematics (OCIAM) (1989–1994).

== Education ==
Tayler was privately educated at King's College School in Wimbledon, London and the University of Oxford where he was a student at Brasenose College, Oxford in 1951. After he was awarded a first class undergraduate degree in Mathematics he worked for a brief period in industry, before returning to academia to complete his Doctor of Philosophy (DPhil) degree supervised by George Temple in 1959.

== Career and research ==
Tayler was a distinguished applied mathematician who made important contributions in a wide range of areas (notably lubrication theory, surface gravity waves and viscous dissipation), but his key contribution to science was as the driving force behind the establishment of what is often called "mathematics-in-industry" or "industrial mathematics" (i.e. the application of mathematical approaches to the modeling and analysis of a wide range of real-world problems) as a recognized scientific discipline in its own right. His philosophy is perfectly exemplified by the Oxford (now European) Study Groups with Industry which he and Professor Leslie Fox created in 1968 and are still going strong today. His approach to mathematical modelling is described in his monograph "Mathematical Models in Applied Mechanics", and is commemorated by the annual Alan Tayler Lecture held at the St Catherine's College, Oxford in November each year. During his career he supervised research of several notable applied mathematicians, including John Ockendon and John King.

In 1959 Alan Tayler became a University Lecturer and Tutorial Fellow at St Catherine's Society, Oxford, and was involved in its transformation into St Catherine's College, Oxford in 1962, where remained for the rest of his career. He was devoted to the College, and held several of its major offices, and also to the Oxford University Rugby Football Club (OURFC), of which he was President from 1990 to 1995.

=== Public service ===
Tayler served as a school governor of the private Abingdon School from 1964 to 1983 and as vice-chairman of its governing board from 1972 to 1981.

=== Awards and honours ===
In 1982 Alan Tayler was jointly awarded (with James Lighthill) the IMA Gold Medal of the Institute of Mathematics and its Applications (IMA) for his services to applied mathematics, and in 1993 he was appointed Commander of the Order of the British Empire (CBE) in 1993 for his services to applied science and industry.

== Personal life ==
Tayler was born in Mitcham, Surrey on 5 September 1931 and died in Ducklington, Oxfordshire on 29 January 1995. In 1955 he married June Earp and they had four daughters, one of whom pre-deceased him.
