= Batchelor–Chandrasekhar equation =

The Batchelor–Chandrasekhar equation is the evolution equation for the scalar functions, defining the two-point velocity correlation tensor of a homogeneous axisymmetric turbulence, named after George Batchelor and Subrahmanyan Chandrasekhar. They developed the theory of homogeneous axisymmetric turbulence based on Howard P. Robertson's work on isotropic turbulence using an invariant principle. This equation is an extension of Kármán–Howarth equation from isotropic to axisymmetric turbulence.

== Mathematical description ==
The theory is based on the principle that the statistical properties are invariant for rotations about a particular direction $\boldsymbol{\lambda}$ (say), and reflections in planes containing $\boldsymbol{\lambda}$ and perpendicular to $\boldsymbol{\lambda}$. This type of axisymmetry is sometimes referred to as strong axisymmetry or axisymmetry in the strong sense, opposed to weak axisymmetry, where reflections in planes perpendicular to $\boldsymbol{\lambda}$ or planes containing $\boldsymbol{\lambda}$ are not allowed.

Let the two-point correlation for homogeneous turbulence be

$$R_{ij}(\mathbf{r},t) = \overline{u_i(\mathbf{x},t)u_j(\mathbf{x}+\mathbf{r},t)}.$$

A single scalar describes this correlation tensor in isotropic turbulence, whereas, it turns out for axisymmetric turbulence, two scalar functions are enough to uniquely specify the correlation tensor. In fact, Batchelor was unable to express the correlation tensor in terms of two scalar functions, but ended up with four scalar functions, nevertheless, Chandrasekhar showed that it could be expressed with only two scalar functions by expressing the solenoidal axisymmetric tensor as the curl of a general axisymmetric skew tensor (reflectionally non-invariant tensor).

Let $\boldsymbol{\lambda}$ be the unit vector which defines the axis of symmetry of the flow, then we have two scalar variables, $\mathbf{r}\cdot\mathbf{r}=r^2$ and $\mathbf{r}\cdot\boldsymbol{\lambda}=r\mu$. Since $|\boldsymbol{\lambda}|=1$, it is clear that $\mu$ represents the cosine of the angle between $\boldsymbol{\lambda}$ and $\mathbf{r}$. Let $Q_1(r,\mu,t)$ and $Q_2(r,\mu,t)$ be the two scalar functions that describes the correlation function, then the most general axisymmetric tensor which is solenoidal (incompressible) is given by,

$$R_{ij} = Ar_ir_j + B\delta_{ij} + C\lambda_i\lambda_j + D \left (\lambda_i r_j + r_i \lambda_j \right )$$

where

$$\begin{align}
A &= \left (D_r-D_{\mu\mu} \right )Q_1+ D_r Q_2, \\
B &= \left [- \left (r^2D_r+r\mu D_\mu+2 \right )+r^2 \left (1-\mu^2 \right )D_{\mu\mu}-r\mu D_\mu \right ]Q_1 - \left [r^2 \left (1-\mu^2 \right )D_r+1 \right ]Q_2, \\
C &= -r^2 D_{\mu\mu}Q_1 + \left (r^2 D_r+1 \right )Q_2, \\
D &= \left (r\mu D_\mu +1 \right )D_\mu Q_1 - r\mu D_r Q_2.
\end{align}$$

The differential operators appearing in the above expressions are defined as

$$\begin{align}
D_r &= \frac{1}{r}\frac{\partial }{\partial r} - \frac{\mu}{r^2} \frac{\partial }{\partial \mu}, \\
D_\mu &= \frac{1}{r} \frac{\partial }{\partial \mu}, \\
D_{\mu\mu} &= D_\mu D_\mu = \frac{1}{r^2} \frac{\partial^2 }{\partial \mu^2}.
\end{align}$$

Then the evolution equations (equivalent form of Kármán–Howarth equation) for the two scalar functions are given by

$$\begin{align}
\frac{\partial Q_1}{\partial t} &= 2\nu\Delta Q_1 + S_1, \\
\frac{\partial Q_2}{\partial t} &= 2\nu \left (\Delta Q_2 + 2 D_{\mu\mu} Q_1 \right ) + S_2
\end{align}$$

where $\nu$ is the kinematic viscosity and

$$\Delta = \frac{\partial^2}{\partial r^2} + \frac{4}{r}\frac{\partial }{\partial r} + \frac{1-\mu^2}{r^2}\frac{\partial^2 }{\partial \mu^2} - \frac{4\mu}{r^2}\frac{\partial }{\partial \mu}.$$

The scalar functions $S_1(r,\mu,t)$ and $S_2(r,\mu,t)$ are related to triply correlated tensor $S_{ij}$, exactly the same way $Q_1(r,\mu,t)$ and $Q_2(r,\mu,t)$ are related to the two point correlated tensor $R_{ij}$. The triply correlated tensor is

$$S_{ij} = \frac{\partial}{\partial r_k} \left( \overline{u_i(\mathbf{x},t) u_k(\mathbf{x},t)u_j(\mathbf{x}+\mathbf{r},t)}-\overline{u_i(\mathbf{x},t) u_k(\mathbf{x}+\mathbf{r},t)u_j(\mathbf{x}+\mathbf{r},t)}\right) + \frac{1}{\rho} \left(\frac{\overline{\partial p(\mathbf{x},t) u_j(\mathbf{x} + \mathbf{r},t)}}{\partial r_i} - \frac{\overline{\partial p(\mathbf{x} + \mathbf{r},t) u_i(\mathbf{x},t)}}{\partial r_j} \right).$$

Here $\rho$ is the density of the fluid.

== Properties ==
The trace of the correlation tensor reduces to

$$R_{ii} =r^2 \left (1-\mu^2 \right ) \left (D_{\mu\mu}Q_1-D_rQ_2 \right )-2Q_2-2 \left (r^2D_r+2r\mu D_\mu +3 \right )Q_1.$$

The homogeneity condition $R_{ij}(-\mathbf{r})=R_{ji}(\mathbf{r})$ implies that both $Q_1$ and $Q_2$ are even functions of $r$ and $r\mu$.

== Decay of the turbulence ==
During decay, if we neglect the triple correlation scalars, then the equations reduce to axially symmetric five-dimensional heat equations,

$$\begin{align}
\frac{\partial Q_1}{\partial t} &= 2\nu\Delta Q_1, \\
\frac{\partial Q_2}{\partial t} &= 2\nu \left ( \Delta Q_2 + 2 D_{\mu\mu} Q_1 \right )
\end{align}$$

Solutions to these five-dimensional heat equations was solved by Chandrasekhar. The initial conditions can be expressed in terms of Gegenbauer polynomials (without loss of generality),

$$\begin{align}
Q_1(r,\mu,0) &= \sum_{n=0}^\infty q_{2n}^{(1)}(r)C_{2n}^{\frac{3}{2}}(\mu), \\
Q_2(r,\mu,0) &= \sum_{n=0}^\infty q_{2n}^{(2)}(r)C_{2n}^{\frac{3}{2}}(\mu),
\end{align}$$

where $C_{2n}^{\frac{3}{2}}(\mu)$ are Gegenbauer polynomials. The required solutions are

$$\begin{align}
Q_1(r,\mu,t) &= \frac{e^{-\frac{r^2}{8\nu t}}}{32(\nu t)^{\frac{5}{2}}} \sum_{n=0}^\infty C_{2n}^{\frac{3}{2}}(\mu) \int_0^\infty e^{-\frac{r'^2}{8\nu t}}r'^4 q_{2n}^{(1)}(r')\frac{I_{2n+\frac{3}{2}} \left (\frac{rr'}{4\nu t} \right )}{\left (\frac{rr'}{4\nu t} \right )^{\frac{3}{2}}}\ dr', \\[8pt]
Q_2(r,\mu,t) &= \frac{e^{-\frac{r^2}{8\nu t}}}{32(\nu t)^{\frac{5}{2}}}\sum_{n=0}^\infty C_{2n}^{\frac{3}{2}}(\mu) \int_0^\infty e^{-\frac{r'^2}{8\nu t}}r'^4 q_{2n}^{(2)}(r')\frac{I_{2n+\frac{3}{2}}\left (\frac{rr'}{4\nu t} \right )}{\left (\frac{rr'}{4\nu t} \right )^{\frac{3}{2}}}\ dr' +4\nu\int_0^t\frac{dt'}{[8\pi\nu(t-t')]^{\frac{5}{2}}} \int\cdots\int\left(\frac{1}{r^2}\frac{\partial^2 Q_1}{\partial \mu^2}\right)_{r',\mu',t'} e^{-\frac{|r-r'|^2}{8\nu(t-t')}}\ dx_1'\cdots dx_5',
\end{align}$$

where $I_{2n+\frac{3}{2}}$ is the Bessel function of the first kind.

As $t\to\infty,$ the solutions become independent of $\mu$

$$\begin{align}
Q_1(r,\mu,t) &\to -\frac{\Lambda_1 e^{-\frac{r^2}{8\nu t}}}{48 \sqrt{2\pi}(\nu t)^{\frac{5}{2}}}, \\
Q_2(r,\mu,t) &\to -\frac{\Lambda_2 e^{-\frac{r^2}{8\nu t}}}{48 \sqrt{2\pi}(\nu t)^{\frac{5}{2}}},
\end{align}$$

where

$$\begin{align}
\Lambda_1 &=-\int_0^\infty q_{2n}^{(1)}(r)\ dr \\
\Lambda_2 &=-\int_0^\infty q_{2n}^{(2)}(r)\ dr
\end{align}$$

== See also ==
- Kármán–Howarth equation
- Kármán–Howarth–Monin equation
