= Howard P. Robertson =

American mathematician (1903–1961)

- Born: January 27, 1903; Hoquiam, Washington, U.S.
- Died: August 26, 1961 (aged 58); Pasadena, California, U.S.
- Education: University of Washington; California Institute of Technology
- Known for: Friedmann–Lemaître–Robertson–Walker metric Poynting–Robertson effect Robertson–Schrödinger relation
- Awards: Medal for Merit (1946)
- Scientific career
- Fields: Physicist
- Workplaces: California Institute of Technology; Princeton University
- Thesis: On Dynamical Space-Times Which Contain a Conformal Euclidean 3-Space (1925)
- Doctoral advisor: Harry Bateman
- Doctoral students: Banesh Hoffmann; Eugene Parker; Ralph J. Slutz; Abraham H. Taub

Howard Percy "Bob" Robertson (January 27, 1903 – August 26, 1961) was an American mathematician and physicist known for contributions related to physical cosmology and the uncertainty principle. He was Professor of Mathematical Physics at the California Institute of Technology and Princeton University.

Robertson made important contributions to the mathematics of quantum mechanics, general relativity and differential geometry. Applying relativity to cosmology, he independently developed the concept of an expanding universe. His name is most often associated with the Poynting–Robertson effect, the process by which solar radiation causes a dust mote orbiting a star to lose angular momentum, which he also described in terms of general relativity.

During World War II, Robertson served with the National Defense Research Committee (NDRC) and the Office of Scientific Research and Development (OSRD). He served as technical consultant to the Secretary of War, the OSRD Liaison Officer in London, and the Chief of the Scientific Intelligence Advisory Section at Supreme Headquarters Allied Expeditionary Force.

After the war Robertson was director of the Weapons Systems Evaluation Group in the Office of the Secretary of Defense from 1950 to 1952, chairman of the Robertson Panel on UFOs in 1953 and scientific advisor to the NATO Supreme Allied Commander Europe (SACEUR) in 1954 and 1955. He was chairman of the Defense Science Board from 1956 to 1961, and a member of the President's Science Advisory Committee (PSAC) from 1957 to 1961.

The Robertson crater on the far side of the Moon is named in his honor.

== Early life ==
Howard Percy Robertson, was born in Hoquiam, Washington, on January 27, 1903, the oldest of five children of George Duncan Robertson, an engineer who built bridges in Washington state, and Anna McLeod, a nurse. His father died when he was 15 years old, but although money was short, all five siblings attended university. He entered the University of Washington in Seattle in 1918, initially with the intention of studying engineering, but he later switched to mathematics. He earned a Bachelor of Science degree in mathematics in 1922 and a Master of Science in mathematics and physics in 1923.

In 1923 Robertson married Angela Turinsky, a philosophy and psychology student at the University of Washington. They had two children: George Duncan, who became a surgeon, and Marietta, who later married California Institute of Technology (Caltech) historian Peter W. Fay. At the University of Washington he also met Eric Temple Bell, who encouraged him to pursue mathematics at Caltech. Robertson completed his PhD dissertation in mathematics and physics there in 1925 under the supervision of Harry Bateman, writing "On Dynamical Space-Times Which Contain a Conformal Euclidean 3-Space".

Upon receipt of his doctorate, Robertson received a National Research Council Fellowship to study at the University of Göttingen in Germany, where he met David Hilbert, Richard Courant, Albert Einstein, Werner Heisenberg, Erwin Schrödinger, Karl Schwarzschild, John von Neumann and Eugene Wigner. He found Max Born unsympathetic to his concept of an expanding universe, which Born considered "rubbish". He also spent six months at the Ludwig-Maximilians-Universität München (LMU), where he was a post-doctoral student of Arnold Sommerfeld.

== Mathematics ==
Robertson returned to the United States in 1927, and became an assistant professor of mathematics at Caltech. In 1928, he accepted a position as an assistant professor of mathematical physics at Princeton University, where he became an associate professor in 1931, and a professor in 1938. He spent 1936 on sabbatical at Caltech. His interest in general relativity and differential geometry led to a series of papers in the 1920s that developed the subject.

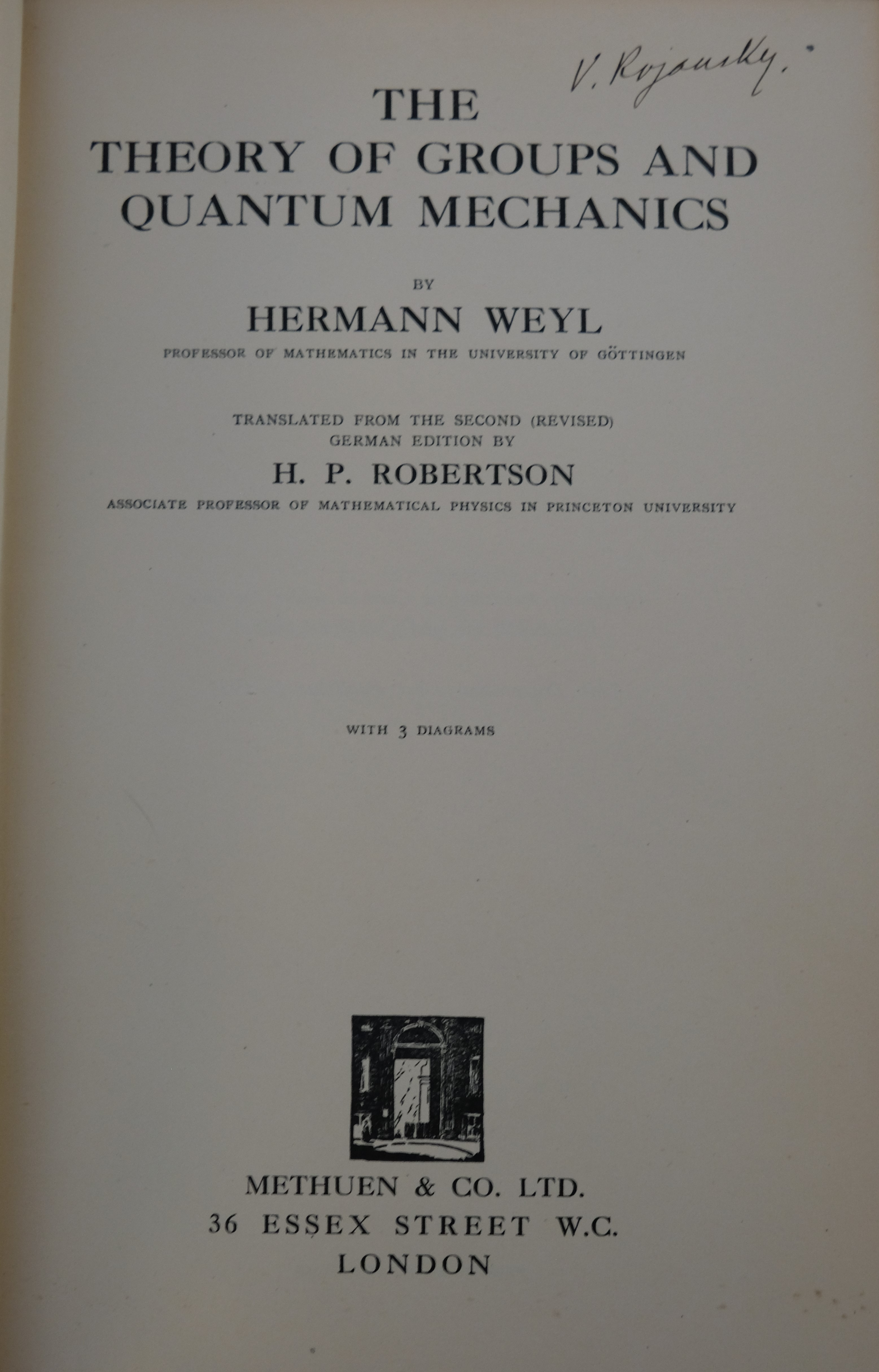
The Theory of Groups and Quantum Mechanics by Hermann Weyl (translated from the second, revised German edition by Robertson)

Robertson wrote three important papers on the mathematics of quantum mechanics. In the first, written in German, he looked at the coordinate system required for the Schrödinger equation to be solvable. The second examined the relationship between the commutative property and Heisenberg's uncertainty principle, generalizing the latter for any two Hermitian operators. The third extended the second to the case of $m$ observables. In 1931 he published a translation of Weyl's The Theory of Groups and Quantum Mechanics.

It was Robertson's anonymous 1936 critical peer review of a paper submitted by Albert Einstein to Physical Review which caused Einstein to withdraw the paper from consideration.

Yet perhaps Robertson's most notable achievements were in applying relativity to cosmology. He independently developed the concept of an expanding universe, which would imply distant galaxies as seen from Earth would be redshifted—a phenomenon previously confirmed by Vesto Slipher . Robertson went on to apply the theory of continuous groups in Riemann spaces to find all the solutions that describe the cosmological spaces. This was extended by Arthur Geoffrey Walker in 1936, and is today widely known in the United States as the Robertson–Walker metric.

One of Robertson's landmark papers, a brief note in The Annals of Mathematics, entitled a "Note on the preceding paper: The two body problem in general relativity", solved that problem within a degree of approximation not improved on for several decades. Earlier work, such as the Schwarzschild metric, were for a central body that did not move, while Robertson's solution considered two bodies orbiting each other. Nevertheless, his solution failed to include gravitational radiation, so the bodies orbit forever, rather than approaching each other.

Yet Robertson's name is most often associated with the Poynting–Robertson effect, the process by which solar radiation causes a dust mote orbiting a star to lose angular momentum. This is related to radiation pressure tangential to the grain's motion. John Henry Poynting described it in 1903 based on the "luminiferous aether" theory, which was superseded by Einstein's theories of relativity. In 1937, Robertson described the effect in terms of general relativity.

Robertson developed the theory of invariants of tensors to derive the Kármán–Howarth equation in 1940, which was later used by George Batchelor and Subrahmanyan Chandrasekhar in the theory of axisymmetric turbulence to derive Batchelor–Chandrasekhar equation.

== World War II ==
Aside from his work in physics, Robertson played a central role in American scientific intelligence during and after World War II. He was approached by Richard Tolman shortly after World War II began in 1939, and began working for the Committee for Passive Protection Against Bombing. This was absorbed with other groups into Division 2 of the National Defense Research Committee (NDRC), with Robertson engaged in the study of terminal ballistics.

In 1943, Robertson became the Office of Scientific Research and Development (OSRD) chief scientific liaison officer in London. He became close friends with Reginald Victor Jones, and Solly Zuckerman praised the work Robertson and Jones did on scrambling radar beams and beacons. In 1944 Robertson also became a technical consultant to the Secretary of War, and the chief of the Scientific Intelligence Advisory Section at Supreme Headquarters Allied Expeditionary Force. His fluency in German helped him to interrogate German scientists, including rocket scientists involved in the V-2 rocket program. He was awarded the Medal for Merit for his contributions to the war effort.

== Later life ==
After the war, Robertson accepted a professorship at Caltech in 1947. He would remain there for the rest of his career, except for long periods of government service. He was a Central Intelligence Agency classified employee and director of the Weapons System Evaluation Group in the Office of the Secretary of Defense from 1950 to 1952, and scientific advisor in 1954 and 1955 to the NATO Supreme Allied Commander Europe (SACEUR), General Alfred M. Gruenther. In 1953 he chaired the Robertson Panel, which investigated a wave of UFO reports in 1952. He was chairman of the Defense Science Board from 1956 to 1961, and a member of the President's Science Advisory Committee (PSAC) from 1957 to 1961.

He was a member of the National Academy of Sciences, serving as its foreign secretary from 1958 until his death in 1961, the American Academy of Arts and Sciences, the American Mathematical Society, the American Physical Society, the American Astronomical Society, the American Philosophical Society, the Operational Research Society, and the Society for Industrial and Applied Mathematics.

In August 1961, Robertson was hospitalized after being injured in a car accident. He suffered a pulmonary embolism and died on August 26, 1961. He was survived by his wife and children. His papers were donated to the Caltech Archives by his daughter and son-in-law in 1971.

== Selected works ==
- — (1927). "Dynamical space-times which contain a conformal Euclidean-space" (PDF). Transactions of the American Mathematical Society. 29 (3): 481–496. Bibcode:1927TrAMS..29..481R. doi:10.1090/S0002-9947-1927-1501400-9.
- — (1928). "Bemerkung über separierbare Systeme in der Wellenmechanik". Mathematische Annalen (in German). 98 (1): 749–752. doi:10.1007/BF01451624. ISSN 0025-5831. S2CID 120180910.
- — (1928). "On Relativistic Cosmology". The London, Edinburgh, and Dublin Philosophical Magazine and Journal of Science. 7. 5 (31): 835–848. doi:10.1080/14786440508564528.
- —; Weyl, H. (1929). "On a problem in the theory of groups arising in the foundations of infinitesimal geometry". Bulletin of the American Mathematical Society. 35 (5): 686–691. doi:10.1090/S0002-9904-1929-04801-8. ISSN 0273-0979.
- — (July 1929). "The Uncertainty Principle". Physical Review. 34 (1): 163–164. Bibcode:1929PhRv...34..163R. doi:10.1103/PhysRev.34.163. ISSN 0031-899X.
- — (1929). "On the Foundations of Relativistic Cosmology". Proceedings of the National Academy of Sciences. 15 (11): 822–829. Bibcode:1929PNAS...15..822R. doi:10.1073/pnas.15.11.822. PMC 522564. PMID 16577245.
- — (November 1934). "An Indeterminacy Relation for Several Observables and Its Classical Interpretation". Physical Review. 46 (9): 794–801. Bibcode:1934PhRv...46..794R. doi:10.1103/PhysRev.46.794. ISSN 0031-899X.
- — (April 1937). "Dynamical effects of radiation in the solar system". Monthly Notices of the Royal Astronomical Society. 97 (6): 423–438. Bibcode:1937MNRAS..97..423R. doi:10.1093/mnras/97.6.423.
- — (1938). "Note on the preceding paper: The two body problem in general relativity". The Annals of Mathematics. 2. 39 (1): 101–104. doi:10.2307/1968715. ISSN 0003-486X. JSTOR 1968715.
