= Triple deck theory =

Triple deck theory is a theory that describes a three-layered boundary-layer structure when sufficiently large disturbances are present in the boundary layer. This theory is able to successfully explain the phenomenon of boundary layer separation, but it has found applications in many other flow setups as well, including the scaling of the lower-branch instability (T-S) of the Blasius flow, etc. James Lighthill, Lev Landau and others were the first to realize that to explain boundary layer separation, different scales other than the classical boundary-layer scales need to be introduced. These scales were first introduced independently by James Lighthill and E. A. Müller in 1953. The triple-layer structure itself was independently discovered by Keith Stewartson (1969) and V. Y. Neiland (1969) and by A. F. Messiter (1970). Stewartson and Messiter considered the separated flow near the trailing edge of a flat plate, whereas Neiland studied the case of a shock impinging on a boundary layer.

Suppose $x$ and $y$ are the streamwise and transverse coordinate with respect to the wall and $Re$ be the Reynolds number, the boundary layer thickness is then $\delta=Re^{-1/2}$. The boundary layer coordinate is $\eta=y Re^{1/2}$. Then the thickness of each deck is

$$\begin{align}
\text{Lower deck}: &\quad y \sim Re^{-5/8}\\
\text{Middle deck}: &\quad y \sim Re^{-4/8}\\
\text{Upper deck}: &\quad y \sim Re^{-3/8}.
\end{align}$$

The lower deck is characterized by viscous, rotational disturbances, whereas the middle deck (same thickness as the boundary-layer thickness) is characterized by inviscid, rotational disturbances. The upper deck, which extends into the potential flow region, is characterized by inviscid, irrotational disturbances.

The interaction zone identified by Lighthill in the streamwise direction is

$\text{Interaction zone}: \quad x \sim Re^{-3/8}.$

The most important aspect of the triple-deck formulation is that pressure is not prescribed, and so it has to be solved as part of the boundary-layer problem. This coupling between velocity and pressure reintroduces ellipticity to the problem, which is in contrast to the parabolic nature of the classical boundary layer of Prandtl.

== Flow near the trailing edge of a flat plate ==
Let the length scales be normalized with the plate length $L$ and the velocity scale by the free-stream velocity $U$; then the only parameter in the problem is the Reynolds number $Re=UL/\nu$. Let the origin $(x,y)=(0,0)$ of the coordinate system be located at the trailing edge of the plate. Further let $(u,v)$ be the non-dimensional velocity components, $p$ be the non-dimensional pressure field and $\psi$ be the non-dimensional stream function such that $u=\partial\psi/\partial y$ and $v=-\partial\psi/\partial x$. For shortness of notation, let us introduce the small parameter $\varepsilon=1/Re^{1/8}$. The coordinate for horizontal interaction and for the three decks can then be defined by

$$\chi = x/\varepsilon^3, \quad \xi = y/\varepsilon^5, \quad \eta = y/\varepsilon^4, \quad \zeta = y/\varepsilon^3.$$

As $\chi\to-\infty$ (or $x\to 0^-$), the solution should approach the asymptotic behaviour of the Blasius solution, which is given by

$$\frac{\psi}{\varepsilon^4} = \sqrt 2 f_B\left(\frac{\eta}{\sqrt 2}\right) + \frac{x}{\sqrt 2} \left[f_B\left(\frac{\eta}{\sqrt 2}\right)-\frac{\eta}{\sqrt 2}f_B'\left(\frac{\eta}{\sqrt 2}\right)\right]+\cdots$$

where $f_B(\eta)$ is the Blasisus function which satisfies $f_B''' +f_Bf_B''=0$ subjected to $f_B(0)=f_B'(0)=f_B'(\infty)-1=0$. As $\chi\to+\infty$ (or $x\to 0^+$), the solution should approach the asymptotic behaviour of the Goldstein's near wake, which is given by

$$\text{Outer wake}: \frac{\psi}{\varepsilon^4}  = \sqrt 2 f_B\left(\frac{\eta}{\sqrt 2}\right) + \frac{\mu x^{1/3}}{\lambda} f_B'\left(\frac{\eta}{\sqrt 2}\right) + \cdots$$

where $\mu=1.1321$ and $\lambda=0.8789$. The Goldstein's inner wake solution is not needed here.

=== Middle deck ===
The solution in the middle deck is found to be

$$\frac{\psi}{\varepsilon^4}  = \sqrt 2 f_B\left(\frac{\eta}{\sqrt 2}\right) + \varepsilon A(\chi)f_B'\left(\frac{\eta}{\sqrt 2}\right) + \varepsilon^2 \Phi(\chi,\eta)+\cdots, \quad p=\varepsilon^2P(\chi)+\cdots$$

where $A(\chi)$ is referred to as the displacement function and $P(\chi)$ is referred to as the pressure function, to be determined from the upper and lower deck problems. Note that the correction to the Blasius stream function is of the order $\varepsilon$, although the pressure perturbation is only order $\varepsilon^2.$

=== Upper deck ===
In the upper deck, the solution is found to given by

$$\frac{\psi}{\varepsilon^4}  = \frac{\zeta}{\varepsilon}-\sqrt 2\beta-\frac{\varepsilon}{\pi} \int_{-\infty}^{+\infty} A'(\chi)\left[\tan^{-1}\left(\frac{\chi-\hat\chi}{\zeta}\right)+\frac{\pi}{2}\right]d\hat\chi+\cdots, \quad p=\varepsilon^2P(\chi)+\cdots$$

where $\beta=1.2168$. Furthermore, the upper deck problem also provides the relation between the displacement and the pressure function as

$$P(\chi)= \mathrm{p.v.} \frac{1}{\pi} \int_{-\infty}^{+\infty} \frac{A'(\hat\chi)}{\chi-\hat\chi}d\hat\chi \quad \text{and} \quad A'(\chi)= -\mathrm{p.v.} \frac{1}{\pi} \int_{-\infty}^{+\infty} \frac{P(\hat\chi)}{\chi-\hat\chi}d\hat\chi.$$

in which $\mathrm{p.v.}$ stands for Cauchy principal value. One may notice that the pressure function and the derivative of the displacement function (aka transverse velocity) forms a Hilbert transform pair (see Kramers–Kronig relations).

=== Lower deck ===
In the lower deck, the solution is given by

$$\frac{\psi}{\varepsilon^4}  = \varepsilon^2\Psi(\chi,\xi)+\cdots, \quad p=\varepsilon^2P(\chi)+\cdots$$

where $\Psi(\chi,\xi)$ will satisfy a boundary-layer type equations driven by the pressure gradient $dP/d\chi$ and the slip-velocity of order $\varepsilon^2$ generated by the middle deck. It is convenient to introduce $\hat u=\partial \Psi/\partial \xi$ and $\hat v=-\partial\Psi/\partial \chi$, where $\hat u$ and $\hat v$ must satisfy

$$\begin{align}
\frac{\partial \hat u}{\partial \chi}+\frac{\partial \hat v}{\partial \xi}&=0,\\
\hat u\frac{\partial \hat u}{\partial \chi}+  \hat v\frac{\partial \hat u}{\partial \xi}& = - \mathrm{p.v.} \frac{1}{\pi} \int_{-\infty}^{+\infty} \frac{A''(\hat\chi)}{\chi-\hat\chi}d\hat\chi + \frac{\partial^2\hat u}{\partial \xi^2}.
\end{align}$$

These equations are subjected to the conditions

$$\xi=0:\,\,\,\begin{cases} \hat u=\hat v=0,\,\,\chi\leq 0,\\
\frac{\partial \hat u}{\partial\xi}=\hat v=0,\,\,\chi>0,
\end{cases} \quad \text{and} \quad \xi\to\infty: \hat u\to \frac{\xi+A(\chi)}{\sqrt{2\alpha^3}},$$
$$\chi\to-\infty: \,\,\, A\to 0,\quad \text{and} \quad \chi\to+\infty: \,\,\, A\to \frac{\mu}{\lambda}\chi^{1/3}$$

where $\alpha=1.6552$. The displacement function $A(\chi)$ and therefore $P(\chi)$ must be obtained as part of the solution. The above set of equations may resemble normal boundary-layer equations, however it has an elliptic character since the pressure gradient term now is non-local, i.e., the pressure gradient at a location $\chi$ depends on other locations as well. Because of this, these equations are sometimes referred to as the interactive boundary-layer equations. The numerical solution of these equations were obtained by Jobe and Burggraf in 1974.

== See also ==
- Flow separation
- Boundary layer
