= David Spence (mathematician) =

Mathematician (1926–2003)

David Spence FIMA FRAeS
- Born: David Allan Spence; 3 January 1926; Auckland, New Zealand
- Died: 7 September 2003 (aged 77); Headington, Oxford, England
- Education: King's College, Auckland
- Alma mater: University of Auckland; University of Cambridge
- Scientific career
- Fields: Mathematics
- Workplaces: Royal Aircraft Establishment; University of Oxford; Imperial College London
- Doctoral students: Hilary Ockendon; Frank T. Smith

David Allan Spence FIMA FRAeS (3 January 1926 – 7 September 2003) was a mathematician who applied his mathematical skills in the aeronautics industry, and to the understanding of geophysical problems. He was born and educated in New Zealand, later moving to England, to take up a Doctorate in Engineering at Clare College, Cambridge. He was employed for a period of time at the then Royal Aircraft Establishment at Farnborough, after which he was appointed to the Engineering Department of the University of Oxford, where he stayed for twenty years. Later, he held the position of Professor of Mathematics at Imperial College London.

== Early life and education ==
Spence, the son of a lawyer, was born in Auckland, New Zealand on 3 January 1926. He was educated at King’s College, Auckland and the University of Auckland, from which he graduated with a both a Bachelor of Science and a Master of Science. He then moved to England where he undertook research in Engineering at Clare College, Cambridge. He was awarded his Doctorate in 1952.

== Career and research ==
After completing his doctorate, Spence took up employment at The Royal Aircraft Establishment, where he undertook research relating to the design of aircraft wings. His paper, The lift coefficient of a thin, jet-flapped wing, his most significant work of the period, was published in the Proceedings of the Royal Society, in 1956. He also studied the propagation of shock waves, specifically how such waves are weakened by viscosity, which is of particular relevance to supersonic flight.

=== Research Interests ===
In 1964, Spence left Farnborough to take up the position at the Engineering Department of the University of Oxford, becoming a Fellow of Lincoln College, Oxford. He remained at Oxford for about twenty years, applying his mathematical techniques to a range of topics, including the compression of solids. This latter work enabled him to apply his skills to the study of magma flow beneath the earth's surface, and how it behaves in the presence of fractures, thereby obtaining a better understanding of volcanic eruptions.

Spence's final years were spent as Professor of Mathematics at Imperial College London, where he taught mathematics to engineering and science students. He continued his research across a range of disciplines, one of which involved the use of injected water to enhance oil recovery from a well - important for energy conservation of depleting reserves in areas such as the North Sea. His research interests were energised by his many visits to universities in Australia, New Zealand and the United States.

=== 1991 - 2003 ===
In 1991, at the age of 65 years, Spence retired from his chair at Imperial College London. His intellectual interest in mathematics and science, expanded to include political history and the law.

David Allan Spence died in Headington, Oxford, on 7 September 2003, aged 77. He was survived by his wife, Isobel and their two sons and two daughters.

Spence's friend Robin Cooke, Baron Cooke of Thorndon, described Spence as perceptive and analytical of human motivation to an extent bordering on cynicism. While deeply respectful of significant achievement in any walk of life he nevertheless had an "attitude towards authority markedly less than reverential - which may at times have hindered his career".

Spence was elected a Fellow of the Royal Aeronautical Society (FRAeS), and of the Institute of Mathematics and its Applications (FIMA), and was a member of the London Mathematical Society. His former doctoral students included Hilary Ockendon and Frank T. Smith.
