= Linda Cummings =

British-American applied mathematician

Linda Jane Cummings is a British and American applied mathematician whose research involves the computational study of complex fluids at micro- and nano-scales, with applications including liquid crystals, the manufacture of optical fibers, and the design of ureteral stents. She is a professor of mathematical sciences at the New Jersey Institute of Technology.

== Education and career ==
Cummings read mathematics at the University of Oxford, receiving a bachelor's degree there in 1993, and continuing for a doctorate (D.Phil.) in 1996. Her dissertation, Free Boundary Models in Viscous Flow, was jointly supervised by John Ockendon and Samuel Dexter Howison.

After postdoctoral research at the University of Oxford, Technion – Israel Institute of Technology, and the École normale supérieure (Paris), she took a faculty position at the University of Nottingham. She moved to the New Jersey Institute of Technology in 2008.

== Recognition ==
Cummings was named as a Fellow of the American Physical Society (APS) in 2023, after a nomination from the APS Division of Fluid Dynamics, "for wide-ranging and impactful contributions to the theoretical study of low-Reynolds-number free surface flows".
