= Adverse pressure gradient =

Pressure gradient in which pressure increases in the direction of fluid flow

In fluid dynamics, an adverse pressure gradient is a pressure gradient in which the static pressure increases in the direction of the flow. Mathematically this is expressed as dP/dx > 0 for a flow in the positive x-direction.

This is important for boundary layers. Increasing the fluid pressure is akin to increasing the potential energy of the fluid, leading to a reduced kinetic energy and a deceleration of the fluid. Since the fluid in the inner part of the boundary layer is slower, it is more greatly affected by the increasing pressure gradient. For a large enough pressure increase, this fluid may slow to zero velocity or even become reversed causing a flow separation. This has very significant consequences in aerodynamics since flow separation significantly modifies the pressure distribution along the surface and hence the lift and drag characteristics.

Turbulent boundary layers tend to be able to sustain an adverse pressure gradient better than an equivalent laminar boundary layer. The more efficient mixing which occurs in a turbulent boundary layer transports kinetic energy from the edge of the boundary layer to the low-momentum flow at the solid surface, often preventing the separation that would occur for a laminar boundary layer under the same conditions. This physical fact has led to a variety of schemes to actually produce turbulent boundary layers when boundary layer separation is dominant at high Reynolds numbers; the dimples on a golf ball, the fuzz on a tennis ball, or the seams on a baseball are good examples. Aeroplane wings are often engineered with vortex generators on the upper surface to produce a turbulent boundary layer.

== See also ==
- Flow separation
