= Derby High School, Derbyshire =

Coordinates: 52.90406°N 1.51537°W

Derby High School
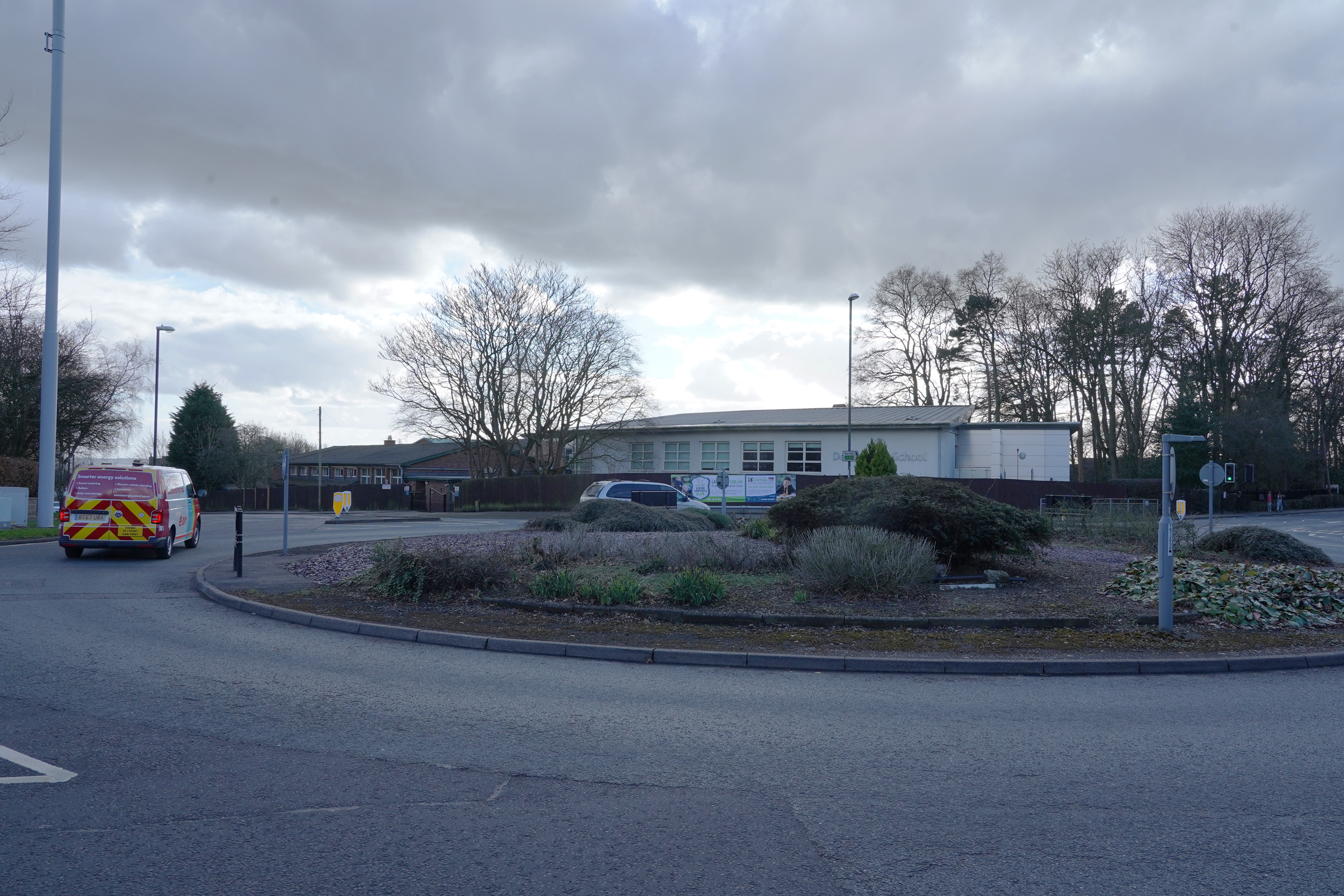

Location
- Hillsway, Littleover; Derby, DE23 3DT; England

Information
- Type: Private day school
- Religious affiliation: Church of England
- Established: 1892
- Department for Education URN: 113017 Tables
- Head Teacher: Amy Chapman
- Staff: 45 full time, 10 part time
- Gender: Co-educational
- Age: 2-3 to 18
- Enrolment: 600
- Houses: St Andrew, St David, St George and St Patrick
- Colours: Navy blue, green, black and white
- Website: www.derbyhigh.derby.sch.uk

Derby High School is a private day school for children aged 3 to 18 in the suburb of Littleover in Derby. Formerly girls only in the Senior School, from September 2019 Derby High accepted boys into Years 7 and 12 (Lower Sixth). In 2022 the school will be fully co-educational with boys in all year groups. The Primary School is co-educational, taking boys and girls from age 3 to 11. The school is a member of IAPS.

The school's main premises are at Hillsway, Littleover, and include sports facilities on site. A dedicated Sixth Form and Music Centre was opened by the Earl of Wessex in 2008 and a new infant and nursery building was formally opened at the site in October 2016 by the Duchess of Gloucester.

== History ==
Derby High School opened at Oxford Villas, a semi-detached house in Osmaston Road, in January 1892, later moving up the road to The Field (now demolished).

Prior to the start of the Second World War the school was forced to evacuate because of its vulnerable position close to Rolls-Royce and the Locomotive Works, both considered prime targets for German bombers. It moved to Mackworth House, now the Mackworth Hotel, a much smaller premises with no playing fields. Instead, children would play on a street and a teacher would keep watch for traffic. In 1940 the school returned to Osmaston Road but was damaged during an air raid on 19 August.

In 1955 discussions were held about moving the school to the site – then known as Hilltop – that it currently occupies in Hillsway, Littleover. The building was purchased but lengthy renovations had to be carried out and was hampered by a fire at The Field that caused more than £4,000 worth of damage. The school entered more troubled times as its buildings at Osmaston Road were flooded after the 1957 East Midlands earthquake damaged some pipes. After much difficulty it finally moved to Hilltop where it has been ever since.

Derby High celebrated its 120th anniversary in January 2012. A book, High Life, containing historical information and old photos was published to commemorate the occasion.

== Academics ==
Students achieved a 100% pass rate in the 2018 GCSEs and A Levels.

=== Curriculum ===
The primary department broadly follows the National Curriculum, assessment at Derby High Primary is not, however, via SATS tests.

The senior curriculum is built around teaching for GCSE and A-level. In the senior school, all subjects are taught by specialist teachers.

The senior school begins with Year 7, which has two forms of equal ability, each with a form tutor. Students are taught in forms for all subjects except Maths, for which there are sets. In Year 7, the traditional core subjects are taught: English (with Drama), Maths, History, Geography, French, Physics, Chemistry, Biology, Art, Music, Design Technology, Home Economics, Religious Studies, PE and ICT.

In Year 8, German or Spanish becomes a second language.

In Years 10, and 11, the sciences (Physics, Chemistry and Biology), humanities (Geography, History and Religious Studies), PE, Art, DT, Home economics and Music are offered to GCSE. All students must take Maths and English and choose six other courses, including at least one language and one science.

Years 12 and 13 are the Lower Sixth and Upper Sixth, with most students taking three A-levels or maybe four.

=== Sports ===
Physical education is compulsory for all children in the school. The main school sports are hockey, athletics, netball, gymnastics, and tennis, plus dance, basketball, badminton, rounders, swimming, trampolining, and volleyball.

=== Notable alumni ===
- Kate Kniveton, politician
- Hilary Ockendon, mathematician
- Kelli Young, singer
