= IMA Gold Medal =

The Gold Medal of the Institute of Mathematics and its Applications (IMA) is a biennial prize established in 1982 by the IMA "in recognition of outstanding contributions to mathematics and its applications over a period of years". These contributions may take several different forms, including "the building up of a research group of exceptional merit", "notable contributions to the application of mathematical techniques" or "outstanding contributions to the improvement of the teaching of mathematics".

== Prize winners list ==
Source: Institute of Mathematics and its Applications

- 1982 Professor Sir J. Lighthill, FRS and Dr A. B. Tayler, CBE
- 1984 Dr J. M. Hammersley, FRS and Sir A. Wilson, FRS
- 1986 Professor G. A. Barnard and Professor Sir S. Edwards, FLSW FRS FIMA
- 1988 Professor Sir H. Bondi, FRS
- 1990 No award
- 1992 Professor O. C. Zienkiewicz, CBE FRS FREng
- 1994 Professor F. Ursell, FRS
- 1996 Professor M. J. D. Powell, FRS
- 1998 No award
- 2000 Professor I. N. Stewart, FRS
- 2002 Professor K. W. Morton and Professor F. C. Piper
- 2004 Professor J. M. T. Thompson, FRS
- 2006 Dr J. R. Ockendon
- 2008 Professor J. D. Murray, FRS and Professor T. J. Pedley, FRS
- 2010 Professor L. N. Trefethen, FRS
- 2012 Dr M. Sabin
- 2014 C. Cocks, CB FRS
- 2016 Professor A. C. Croft and Professor D. A. Lawson, MBE
- 2018 Professor R. Twarock
- 2020 Professor N. J. Higham, FRS
- 2022 Professor P. K. Maini, FRS FMedSci FIMA
- 2024 Professor I. D. Abrahams, CMath FIMA
- 2026 Professor Celia Hoyles and Professor Chris Budd

== See also ==
- List of mathematics awards
