= Joan E. Walsh =

British applied mathematician (1932-2017)

Joan Walsh
- Born: 7 October 1932
- Died: 30 December 2017 (aged 85)
- Education: University of Oxford (BA)(1954) University of Cambridge (Dip)(1958); University of Oxford (DPhil)(1961)
- Scientific career
- Fields: Mathematics; Numerical analysis
- Workplaces: University of Manchester
- Thesis: Numerical solution of partial differential equations using a high speed computer (1960)
- Doctoral advisor: Leslie Fox
- Doctoral students: Thomas Sag; Les Graney; David Sayers; Geoffrey McKeown; Roderick Cook; Patricia Hanson; Guy Lonsdale; Chan Basaruddin; Fathalla Rihan (supervised jointly with C. T. H. Baker)

Joan Eileen Walsh FIMA (7 October 1932 – 30 December 2017) was a British mathematician, a professor of numerical analysis at the University of Manchester, and the founding chair of the Numerical Algorithms Group.

== Education ==
Walsh read mathematics at the University of Oxford, where she earned a bachelor's degree with first class honours in 1954. She became a teacher and assistant mistress at Howell's School, Denbigh, but left after three years to study numerical analysis at the University of Cambridge. She earned a diploma (with distinction) from Cambridge in 1958, and returned to Oxford for her doctoral studies. There, she became the first doctoral student of Leslie Fox, completing her D.Phil. in 1961. She was also the first student to obtain a doctorate from the Oxford Computing Laboratory, the predecessor to the Department of Computer Science, University of Oxford.

== Career ==
After working as a mathematical programmer for the Central Electricity Generating Board, Walsh joined the mathematics staff at the University of Manchester in 1963. In 1974 she was appointed as Professor of Numerical Analysis there in 1974. She was head of the mathematics department at Manchester from 1986 to 1989, and in 1990 became pro-vice-chancellor of the university. She retired to become a professor emeritus in 1998.

Walsh was one of the four founders of the Nottingham Algorithms Group in 1970, along with Brian Ford, who was a Lecturer at the University of Nottingham; Shirley Lill, Lecturer in Optimization at the University of Leeds; and Linda Hayes, who was the research assistant of Professor Leslie Fox. The Nottingham Algorithms Group subsequently became the Numerical Algorithms Group Ltd. and Walsh became founding chair in 1976. Software libraries such as the NAG library are now seen as essential to the work of all computational scientists. Walsh is considered to be a pioneer in the field of computing as it developed in the second half of the 20th century.

== Research ==
Walsh conducted research into the numerical solution of ordinary differential equation boundary value problems and partial differential equations. She carried out a large part of her research in collaboration with PhD students.

== Recognition ==
Walsh was a Fellow of the Institute of Mathematics and its Applications (from 1984).
Vice-President of the Institute of Mathematics and its Applications (1992-1993).
She was also President of the National Conference of University Professors (1993–1994).
and received a NAG Life Service Recognition Award (2011)

== Personal life ==
Walsh was a devout Catholic. After her retirement, she completed an MA in Contemporary Theology in the Catholic Tradition at Heythrop College, University of London. She also successfully campaigned for the restoration of the Tridentine Latin Mass to the liturgy of the world-wide church.

She died on 30 December 2017.
