= Hilary Ockendon =

British applied mathematician

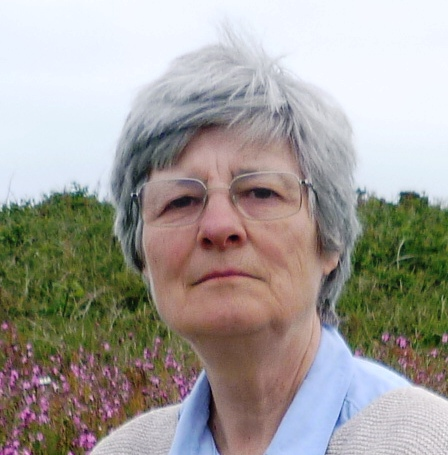
- Born: Hilary Mason; 1941 (age 84–85); Derby, UK
- Education: Derby High School for Girls
- Alma mater: University of Oxford (BA, DPhil)
- Spouse: John Ockendon (m. 1967)
- Scientific career
- Fields: Mathematics; Fluid Mechanics; Asymptotic Methods; Industrial applications
- Workplaces: University of Oxford; GCHQ
- Thesis: Studies in Relaxing Gas Flow (1968)
- Doctoral advisor: David Spence
- Website: www.maths.ox.ac.uk/people/hilary.ockendon

Hilary Ockendon (née Mason, born 1941) is a British mathematician who worked at the University of Oxford until retirement in 2008. Her research focuses on applications of mathematics with a particular interest in continuum models for industrial problems. She is an emeritus fellow of Somerville College, Oxford, the former president of the European Consortium for Mathematics in Industry, and the author of multiple books on fluid dynamics. She is an expert on problems in fluid dynamics, such as the reduction of sloshing in coffee cups.

== Education and career ==
Born in Derby in 1941 Ockendon was privately educated at Derby High School for Girls from 1946 to 1959. In 1959 she started an undergraduate degree in mathematics at the University of Oxford as a student of St Hilda's College, Oxford. After graduating her first job was at GCHQ but after 2 years she obtained a research/teaching post at Somerville College, Oxford and returned to Oxford. She completed her DPhil in 1968, and her dissertation, Studies in Relaxing Gas Flow, was supervised by David Spence..

== Career and research ==
After her DPhil, she appointed a Tutorial Fellow at Somerville College and a lecturer at the University of Oxford, she held these positions until her retirement in 2008. Between 1988 and 1990 she served as Vice-Principal of Somerville: .

Between 1994 and 2002 Ockendon served as director of the Oxford Centre for Industrial and Applied Mathematics at the University of Oxford, where she is now an emerita member. She has been an Emeritus Fellow of Somerville College, Oxford since 2008. She was president of the European Consortium for Mathematics in Industry from 2001 to 2003.

== Research and career ==
Ockendon embarked on research in fluid mechanics but soon became involved in the Study Groups with Industry that were launched in Oxford in 1968 and since then much of her work has been driven by industrial problems.

The industrial problems she has worked on have come from a wide range of application areas but have mainly focussed on continuum models in fluids and solids. A particular area of interest has been the problems from the textile industry. She has also had a longstanding interest in nonlinear wave theory – both in fluids and solids. She was co-author of two textbooks on Fluid Mechanics both of which came out of lecture courses developed at Oxford.

=== Books ===
Ockendon is the author of:

- Inviscid Fluid Flows (with Alan B. Taylor, Oxford University, 1972; Springer, 1983)
- Viscous Flow (with John Ockendon, Cambridge University Press, 1995)
- Waves and Compressible Flow (with John Ockendon, Springer, 2004; 2nd ed., 2015)

=== Knowledge transfer ===
Ockendon has had a particular interest in promoting Industrial Mathematics in Europe via the European Consortium for Mathematics in Industry: Council member (1998-2005), President (2001-2003), executive director (2012–15).

=== Awards and honours ===
- Honorary Doctor of Science (DSc) degree University of Southampton, 1999.
- Honorary member of European Consortium for Mathematics in Industry (ECMI) since 2018.

== Personal life ==
Ockendon married John Ockendon in 1967.
