= Lighthill's eighth power law =

In aeroacoustics, Lighthill's eighth power law states that power of the sound created by a turbulent motion, far from the turbulence, is proportional to eighth power of the characteristic turbulent velocity, derived by Sir James Lighthill in 1952. This is used to calculate the total acoustic power of the jet noise. The law reads as

$$W = K \frac{\rho_o}{c_o^5} L^2 U^8,$$

where

- $W$ is the acoustic power in the far-field,
- $K$ is the proportionality constant (or Lighthill's constant),
- $\rho_o$ is the uniform fluid density,
- $c_o$ is the speed of sound,
- $L$ is the characteristic length scale of the turbulent source and
- $U$ is the characteristic velocity scale of the turbulent source.

The eighth power is experimentally verified and found to be accurate for low speed flows, i.e., Mach number is small, $M<1$. And also, the source has to be compact to apply this law.
