= Flow separation =

Detachment of a boundary layer from a surface into a wake

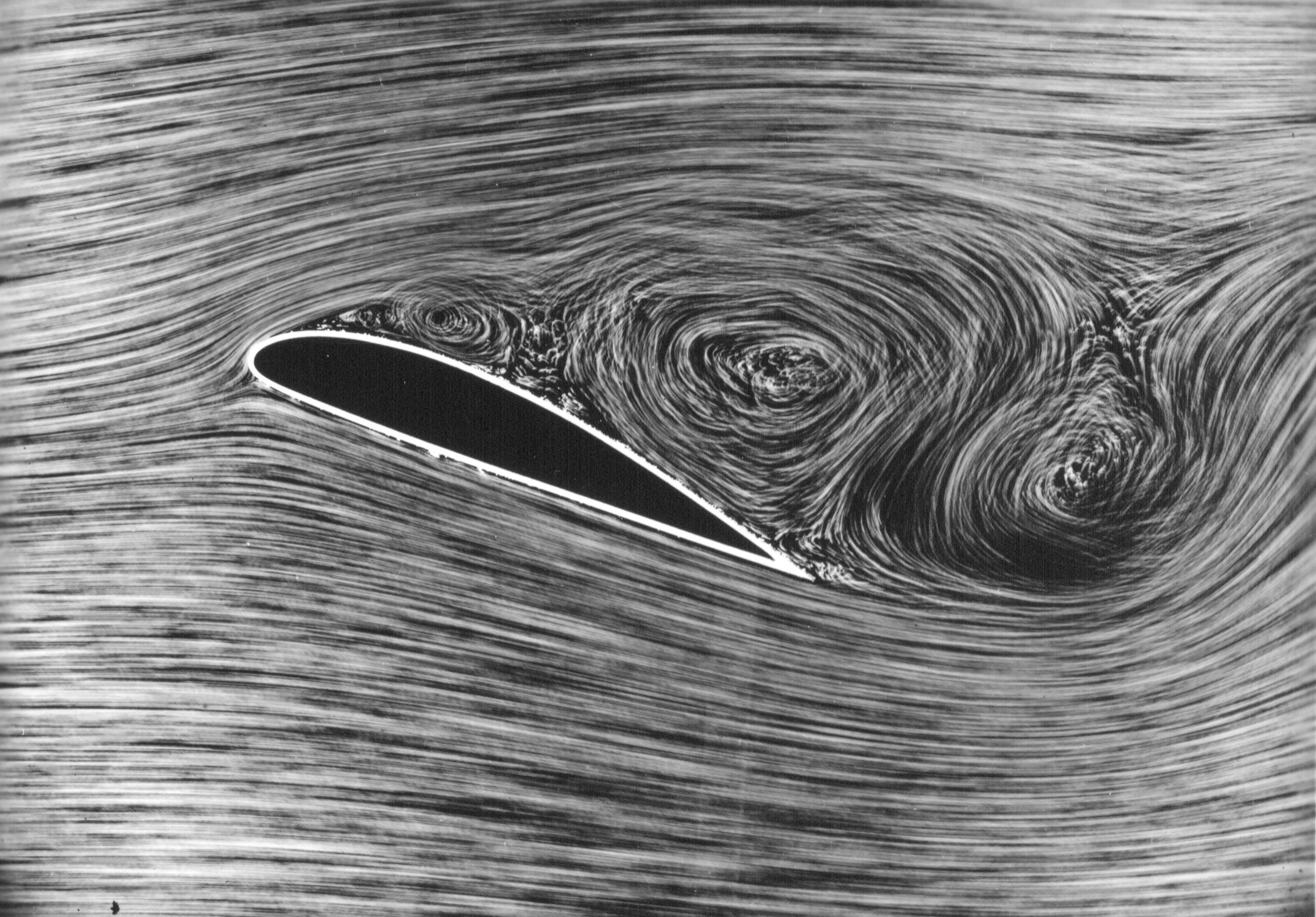
Airflow separating from a wing at a high angle of attack

In fluid dynamics, flow separation or boundary layer separation is the detachment of a boundary layer from a surface into a wake.

A boundary layer exists whenever there is movement between a fluid and a solid surface. Viscous shear forces are present in the layer of fluid close to the surface. Boundary layers can be either laminar or turbulent. A reasonable assessment of whether the boundary layer will be laminar or turbulent can be made by calculating the Reynolds number of the local flow conditions.

Separation occurs in flow that is slowing down after passing the thickest part of a streamline body or passing through a widening passage. Where a flow is slowing pressure is increasing.

Flowing against an increasing pressure is known as flowing in an adverse pressure gradient. The boundary layer separates when it has travelled far enough in an adverse pressure gradient that the speed of the boundary layer relative to the surface has stopped and reversed direction. The flow becomes detached from the surface, and instead takes the forms of eddies and vortices. The fluid exerts a constant pressure on the surface once it has separated instead of a continually increasing pressure if still attached. In aerodynamics, flow separation results in reduced lift and increased pressure drag, caused by the pressure differential between the front and rear surfaces of the object. It causes buffeting of aircraft structures and control surfaces. In internal passages separation causes stalling and vibrations in machinery blading and increased losses (lower efficiency) in inlets and compressors. Much effort and research has gone into the design of aerodynamic and hydrodynamic surface contours and added features which delay flow separation and keep the flow attached for as long as possible. Examples include the fur on a tennis ball, dimples on a golf ball, turbulators on a glider, which induce an early transition to turbulent flow; vortex generators on aircraft.

== Adverse pressure gradient ==
Graphical representation of the velocity profile in the boundary layer. The last profile represents reverse flow which shows separated flow.

The flow reversal is primarily caused by adverse pressure gradient imposed on the boundary layer by the outer potential flow. The streamwise momentum equation inside the boundary layer is approximately stated as

$$u {\partial u \over \partial s} = -{1 \over \rho}{dp \over ds} + {\nu} {\partial^2 u \over \partial y^2}$$

where $s,y$ are streamwise and normal coordinates. An adverse pressure gradient is when $dp/ds > 0$, which then can be seen to cause the velocity $u$ to decrease along $s$ and possibly go to zero if the adverse pressure gradient is strong enough.

== Influencing parameters ==
The tendency of a boundary layer to separate primarily depends on the distribution of the adverse or negative edge velocity gradient $du_o/ds (s) < 0$ along the surface, which in turn is directly related to the pressure and its gradient by the differential form of the Bernoulli relation, which is the same as the momentum equation for the outer inviscid flow.

$$\rho u_o {du_o \over ds} = -{dp \over ds}$$

But the general magnitudes of $du_o/ds$ required for separation are much greater for turbulent than for laminar flow, the former being able to tolerate nearly an order of magnitude stronger flow deceleration. A secondary influence is the Reynolds number. For a given adverse $du_o/ds$ distribution, the separation resistance of a turbulent boundary layer increases slightly with increasing Reynolds number. In contrast, the separation resistance of a laminar boundary layer is independent of Reynolds number — a somewhat counterintuitive fact.

== Internal separation ==
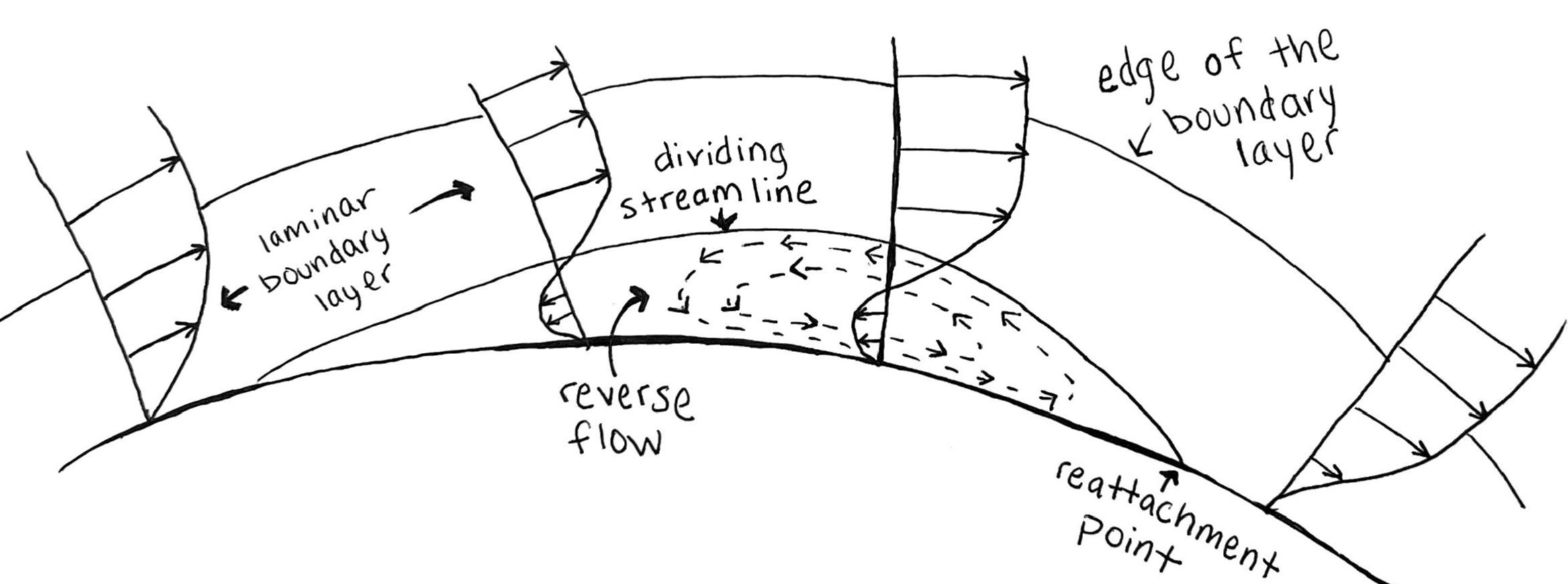
A schematic of internal boundary layer separation

Boundary layer separation can occur for internal flows. It can result from such causes such as a rapidly expanding duct of pipe. Separation occurs due to an adverse pressure gradient encountered as the flow expands, causing an extended region of separated flow. The part of the flow that separates the recirculating flow and the flow through the central region of the duct is called the dividing streamline. The point where the dividing streamline attaches to the wall again is called the reattachment point. As the flow goes farther downstream it eventually achieves an equilibrium state and has no reverse flow.

== Effects of boundary layer separation ==
When the boundary layer separates, its remnants form a shear layer and the presence of a separated flow region between the shear layer and surface modifies the outside potential flow and pressure field. In the case of airfoils, the pressure field modification results in an increase in pressure drag, and if severe enough will also result in stall and loss of lift, all of which are undesirable. For internal flows, flow separation produces an increase in the flow losses, and stall-type phenomena such as compressor surge, both undesirable phenomena.

Another effect of boundary layer separation is regular shedding vortices, known as a Kármán vortex street. Vortices shed from the bluff downstream surface of a structure at a frequency depending on the speed of the flow. Vortex shedding produces an alternating force which can lead to vibrations in the structure. If the shedding frequency coincides with a resonance frequency of the structure, it can cause structural failure. These vibrations could be established and reflected at different frequencies based on their origin in adjacent solid or fluid bodies and could either damp or amplify the resonance.

== See also ==
- Triple-deck theory
- Aerodynamics
- D'Alembert's paradox
- Magnus effect
