= John Ockendon =

John Ockendon FRS
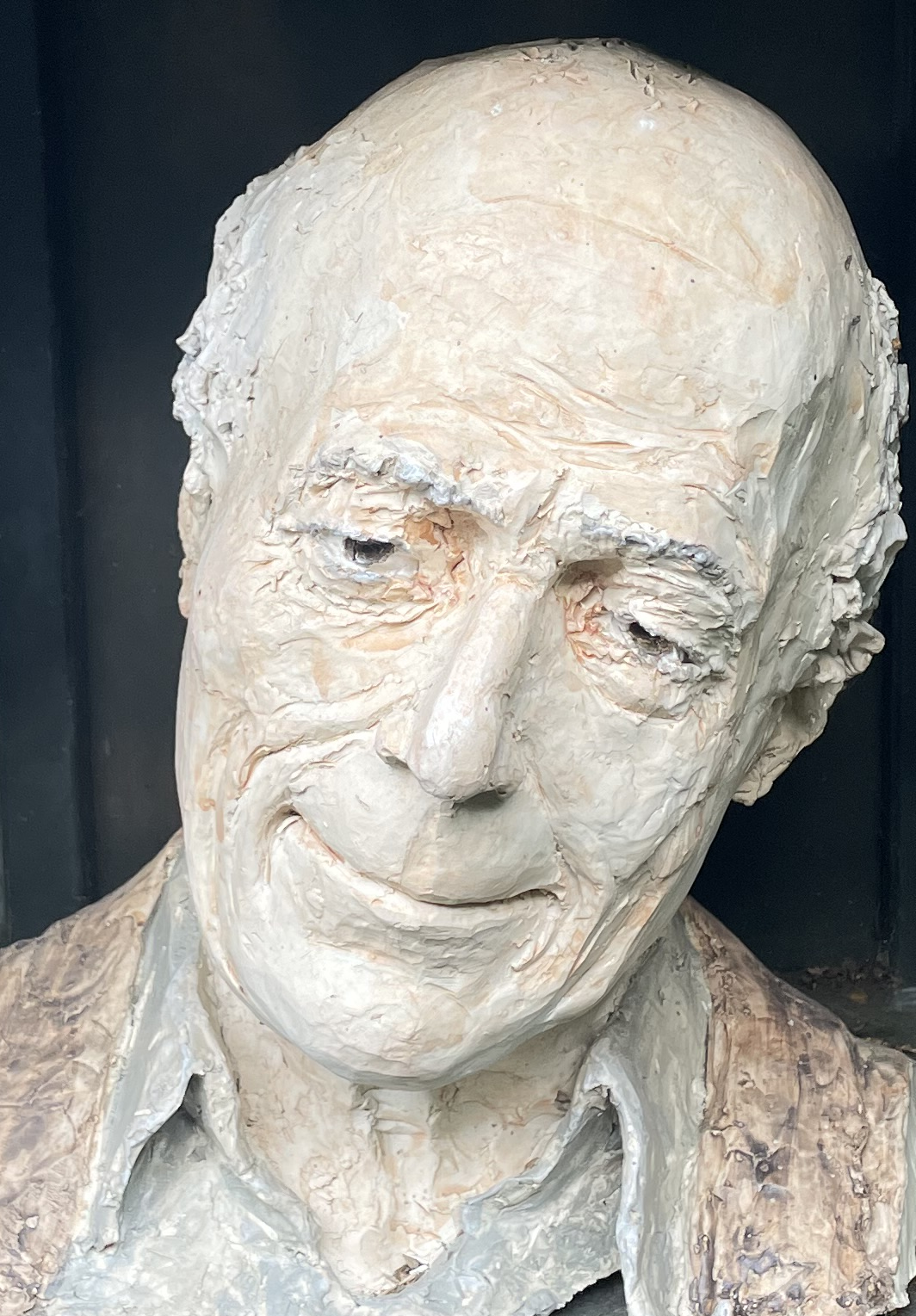
- Terracotta bust of Ockendon at St Catherine's College, Oxford
- Born: John Richard Ockendon; October 13, 1940 (age 85)
- Education: Dulwich College
- Alma mater: University of Oxford (MA, DPhil)
- Spouse: Hilary Ockendon (m. 1967)
- Awards: IMA Gold Medal (2006)
- Scientific career
- Fields: Applied mathematics
- Institutions: University of Oxford
- Thesis: Some problems in fluid dynamics (1965)
- Doctoral advisor: Alan B. Tayler
- Doctoral students: Linda Cummings; Frank T. Smith
- Website: www.maths.ox.ac.uk/people/john.ockendon

John Richard Ockendon FRS (born 1940) is an applied mathematician noted especially for his contribution to fluid dynamics and novel applications of mathematics to real world problems. He is a professor at the University of Oxford and an Emeritus Fellow at St Catherine's College, Oxford, served as the first director of the Oxford Centre for Collaborative Applied Mathematics (OCCAM) and a former director of the Smith Institute for Industrial Mathematics and System Engineering.

== Education ==
Ockendon was privately educated at Dulwich College and the University of Oxford where he was awarded a Doctor of Philosophy degree in 1965 for research on fluid dynamics supervised by Alan B. Tayler.

== Research and career ==
His initial fluid mechanics interests included hypersonic aerodynamics, creeping flow, sloshing and channel flows and leading to flows in porous media, ship hydrodynamics and models for flow separation.

He moved on to free and moving boundary problems. He pioneered the study of diffusion-controlled moving boundary problems in the 1970s his involvement centring on models for phase changes and elastic contact problems all built around the paradigm of the Hele-Shaw free boundary problem. Other industrial collaboration has led to new ideas for lens design, fibre manufacture, extensional and surface-tension- driven flows and glass manufacture, fluidised-bed models, semiconductor device modelling and a range of other problems in mechanics and heat and mass transfer, especially scattering and ray theory, nonlinear wave propagation, nonlinear oscillations, nonlinear diffusion and impact in solids and liquids.

His efforts to promote mathematical collaboration with industry led him to organise annual meetings of the Study Groups with Industry from 1972 to 1989.

=== Awards and honours ===
Ockendon was elected Fellow of the Royal Society (FRS) in 1999, and awarded the IMA Gold Medal by the Institute of Mathematics and its Applications in 2006.

== Personal life ==
Ockendon is married to his coauthor and colleague Hilary Ockendon (née Mason). His Who's Who entry lists his recreations as mathematical modelling, bird watching, Hornby-Dublo model trains and old sports cars.
