= Leslie Fox =

English mathematician

- Born: 30 September 1918; Dewsbury, England
- Died: 1 August 1992 (aged 73); Oxford, England
- Education: Christ Church, Oxford
- Scientific career
- Fields: Mathematics
- Workplaces: University of Oxford
- Doctoral advisor: Richard Vynne Southwell
- Doctoral students: Iain S. Duff; John Reid; Frederic Ris; Joan E. Walsh

Leslie Fox (30 September 1918 – 1 August 1992) was a British mathematician noted for his contribution to numerical analysis.

== Overview ==
Fox studied mathematics as a scholar of Christ Church, Oxford graduating with a first in 1939 and continued to undertake research in the engineering department. While working on his D.Phil. in computational and engineering mathematics under the supervision of Sir Richard Southwell he was also engaged in highly secret war work. He worked on the numerical solution of partial differential equations at a time when numerical linear algebra was performed on a desk calculator. Computational efficiency and accuracy was thus even more important than in the days of electronic computers. Some of this work was published after the end of the Second World War jointly with his supervisor Richard Southwell.

On gaining his doctorate in 1942, Fox joined the Admiralty Computing service. Following World War II in 1945, he went to work in the mathematics division of the National Physical Laboratory. He left the National Physical Laboratory in 1956 and spent a year at the University of California. In 1957 Fox took up an appointment at Oxford University where he set up the Oxford University Computing Laboratory. In 1963, Fox was appointed as Professor of Numerical Analysis at Oxford and Fellow of Balliol College, Oxford.

Fox's laboratory at Oxford was one of the founding organisations of the Numerical Algorithms Group (NAG), and Fox was also a dedicated supporter of the Institute of Mathematics and its Applications (IMA). The Leslie Fox Prize for Numerical Analysis of the IMA is named in his honour.

== Mathematical work ==
A detailed description of Fox's mathematical research can be found in obituaries and is summarised here. His early work with Southwell was concerned with the numerical solution of partial differential equations arising in engineering problems that, due to the complexity of their geometry, did not have analytical solutions. Southwell's group developed efficient and accurate relaxation methods, which could be implemented on desk calculators. Fox's contributions were particularly notable because he combined practical skills with theoretical advances in relaxation methods, which were to become important areas of research in numerical analysis. During the 1950 automatic electronic computers were replacing manual electro-mechanical devices. This led to different problems in the implementation of numerical algorithms; however, the approach of approximating a partial differential equation by finite difference method and thus reducing the problem to a system of linear equations was the same. Careful analysis of the errors was a theme of many of Fox's early papers. His work at the Admiralty Computing Service and the National Physical Laboratory led to an interest in the computation of special functions, and his calculations were used in published tables. The techniques applied to the computation of special functions had much wider applicability including interpolation, stability of recurrence relations and asymptotic behaviour.

During the 1950s, the group at the National Physics Laboratory worked on numerical linear algebra, which led to the publication of algorithms by Wilkinson and others. While not directly involved in development of numerical software, he supported others in this endeavour. Fox worked on procedures for solving differential equations in which the accuracy of the solution is estimated using asymptotic estimates. Fox's paper on this in 1947 led to the work of Victor Pereyra error-correcting algorithms for boundary-value problems and Stetter's results on defect correction and the resulting order of convergence.

Fox was also interested in the treatment of singularities in partial differential equations, the Stefan problem and other cases of free and moving boundaries. Many of these problems arose from his collaboration with mathematicians in industry through the Oxford Study Groups.

== Fox's wider influence ==
While Fox influenced the development of numerical analysis through his undergraduate teaching and postgraduate supervision (he supervised around 19 doctoral students), industrial collaboration he also made significant contributions to course material for the Open University. He lectured widely on 'meaningless answers', describing some of the pitfalls of numerical computation from the uncritical use of simple methods

Fox played a significant part in the early days of the Numerical Algorithms Group (NAG), which set out as a collaborative venture between Oxford, Nottingham and Manchester to provide a reliable and well-tested mathematical subroutine library. The Oxford University Computing Laboratory was one of the founder members of NAG when it started in 1970; Fox supported it strongly and he became a member of its council when the Group was incorporated in 1976 continuing in this capacity until 1984.

Fox was an active member of the Institute of Mathematics and its Applications from its beginnings, as a member of the Council and as an editor first of the main IMA Journal and later the specialised Journal of Numerical Analysis, started in 1981. The IMA marked his retirement from Oxford in 1983 by a special IMA symposium on 'The contributions of Leslie Fox to numerical analysis'.

His interests extended to mathematics in schools and he participated the development of the School Mathematics Project, and was active in the local branch of the Mathematical Association, of which he was President in 1964. The first winner of the IMA's Leslie Fox prize for Numerical Analysis in 1985, Lloyd N. Trefethen, went on to be appointed to the chair in Numerical Analysis at Oxford that was created for Leslie Fox in 1963.

== Personal life ==
Leslie Fox's mother was Annie Vincent and his father was Job Senior Fox who was a coalminer. Leslie Fox won a scholarship to Wheelwright Grammar School in Dewsbury, which produced several notable scientists from the same period as Fox.

Fox was a keen sportsman and played football for the university Football Club as well as for Oxford City Football Club. At the National Physical Laboratory he was club tennis champion and captain of the cricket team, he also distinguished himself as a sprinter in the civil service championships.

Fox, who had enjoyed good health up to 1981, suffered from heart problems during his retirement and died from a ruptured aneurysm in the John Radcliffe Hospital, Oxford, in 1992.

== Selected publications ==
- Leslie Fox, The Numerical Solution of Two-Point Boundary Problems in Ordinary Differential Equations, 1957, reprinted by Dover, 1990. ISBN 0-486-66495-3
- L. Fox, An introduction to numerical linear algebra, 1964, Oxford University Press, Oxford, England. ISBN 0-19-500325-X
- L. Fox, D.F. Mayers, Numerical solution of ordinary differential equations. Chapman & Hall, London, 1987. ISBN 0-412-22650-2
