= Stewartson layer =

Shear layer connecting differentially rotating regions

In fluid dynamics, a Stewartson layer is a thin cylindrical shear layer that connects two differentially rotating regions in the radial direction, namely the inside and outside the cylinder. The Stewartson layer, typically, also connects different Ekman boundary layers in the axial direction. The existence of such layer was first noted by Ian Proudman, while its structure was first described by Keith Stewartson. This layer should be compared with the Ekman layer which occurs near solid boundaries.

== Structure ==
The Stewartson layer is not elementary but possesses a complex structure and emerges when the relevant Ekman number is $\mathrm{Ek}=\nu/\Omega L^2\ll 1$; here $\nu$ is the kinematic viscosity, $\Omega$ and $L$ are the characteristic scales for the angular speed and length. The fundamental balance that occurs in the Stewartson shear layer is between Coriolis forces and viscous forces.

=== Spherical geometry ===
For simplicity, consider the example of two concentric spheres that rotate about a common axis with slightly different angular velocity. The fluid domain corresponds to the annular region. In this problem, the Stewartson layer emerges as a cylinder $\mathcal{D}$ circumscribing the inner sphere with its generators lying parallel to the rotation axis. Outside $\mathcal{D}$, the fluid rotates as a solid body with a speed that of the outer sphere. Inside $\mathcal{D}$ (in the annular region), again the fluid rotates as a solid body, except near the inner and outer sphere walls, where Ekman boundary layers of thickness $\mathrm{Ek}^{1/2}$ are set up that help adjusting the flow to transition from uniform rotation to their respective rotating values on the solid walls. Across $\mathcal{D}$, there is a jump in the azimuthal velocity and on $\mathcal{D}$, there is an axial flow connecting the two Ekman layers. The structure of $\mathcal{D}$ is the Stewartson layer.

The Stewartson layer consists of two outer layers, one on the inner side of $\mathcal{D}$ with a thicknesses $\mathrm{Ek}^{2/7}$ and one on the outer side of $\mathcal{D}$ with a thickness $\mathrm{Ek}^{1/4}$; these outer layers flank a thin inner layer of thickness $\mathrm{Ek}^{1/3}$. The differential rotation between inside and outside $\mathcal{D}$ is smoothed out in the outer layers (primarily in the outer layer lying on the outer side of $\mathcal{D}$). The adjustment of azimuthal motion in the outer layers induces secondary axial flow. The inner layer becomes necessary partly to accommodate this induced axial motion and partly to accommodate the transport of flow between one Ekman boundary layer to the other one (from the Ekman layer on the faster-rotating sphere to the slower one). Note that the thickness of the Ekman layer is $\mathrm{Ek}^{1/2}$, which is much smaller than the inner Stewartson layer. In the inner layer, change in the azimuthal velocity is very small, because the outer layers are already smoothed out jump in the azimuthal velocity. In addition, the outer layers (again primarily in the outler layer lying outer side of the cylinder) also transport axially flow from the fast rotating sphere to slower one.

=== Cylindrical geometry ===
In cylindrical geometries, the thickness of both the two outer layers is $\mathrm{Ek}^{1/4}$ and the thickness of inner layer is $\mathrm{Ek}^{1/3}$.

== See also ==
- Ekman layer
