= Kármán–Howarth equation =

Mathematical equation

In isotropic turbulence the Kármán–Howarth equation (after Theodore von Kármán and Leslie Howarth 1938), which is derived from the Navier–Stokes equations, is used to describe the evolution of non-dimensional longitudinal autocorrelation.

== Mathematical description ==
Consider a two-point velocity correlation tensor for homogeneous turbulence

$$R_{ij}(\mathbf{r},t) = \overline{u_i(\mathbf{x},t) u_j(\mathbf{x} + \mathbf{r},t)}.$$

For isotropic turbulence, this correlation tensor can be expressed in terms of two scalar functions, using the invariant theory of full rotation group, first derived by Howard P. Robertson in 1940,

$$R_{ij}(\mathbf{r},t) = u'^2 \left\{ [f(r,t)-g(r,t)]\frac{r_ir_j}{r^2} + g(r,t) \delta_{ij}\right\}, \quad f(r,t) = \frac{R_{11}}{u'^2}, \quad g(r,t) = \frac{R_{22}}{u'^2}$$

where $u'$ is the root mean square turbulent velocity and $u_1,\ u_2, \ u_3$ are turbulent velocity in all three directions. Here, $f(r)$ is the longitudinal correlation and $g(r)$ is the lateral correlation of velocity at two different points. From continuity equation, we have

$$\frac{\partial R_{ij}}{\partial r_j}=0 \quad \Rightarrow \quad g(r,t) = f(r,t) + \frac{r}{2} \frac{\partial}{\partial r}f(r,t)$$

Thus $f(r,t)$ uniquely determines the two-point correlation function. Theodore von Kármán and Leslie Howarth derived the evolution equation for $f(r,t)$ from Navier–Stokes equation as

$$\frac \partial {\partial t} (u'^2 f) - \frac{u'^3}{r^4} \frac \partial {\partial r} (r^4 h) = \frac{2\nu u'^2}{r^4} \frac\partial {\partial r} \left(r^4 \frac{\partial f}{\partial r}\right)$$

where $h(r,t)$ uniquely determines the triple correlation tensor

$$S_{ij} = {} \frac{\partial }{\partial r_k} \left( \overline{u_i(\mathbf{x},t) u_k(\mathbf{x},t)u_j(\mathbf{x}+\mathbf{r},t)}-\overline{u_i(\mathbf{x},t) u_k(\mathbf{x}+\mathbf{r},t)u_j(\mathbf{x}+\mathbf{r},t)}\right).$$

== Loitsianskii's invariant ==
L.G. Loitsianskii derived an integral invariant for the decay of the turbulence by taking the fourth moment of the Kármán–Howarth equation in 1939, i.e.,

$$\frac \partial {\partial t} \left(u'^2 \int_0^\infty r^4 f\ dr\right) = \left[2\nu u'^2 r^4 \frac{\partial f}{\partial r} + u'^3 r^4 h\right]_0^\infty.$$

If $f(r)$ decays faster than $r^{-3}$ as $r\rightarrow\infty$ and also in this limit, if we assume that $r^4 h$ vanishes, we have the quantity,

$$\Lambda = u'^2 \int_0^\infty r^4 f\ dr = \mathrm{constant}$$

which is invariant. Lev Landau and Evgeny Lifshitz showed that this invariant is equivalent to conservation of angular momentum. However, Ian Proudman and W.H. Reid showed that this invariant does not hold always since $\lim_{r\rightarrow\infty} (r^4 h)$ is not in general zero, at least, in the initial period of the decay. In 1967, Philip Saffman showed that this integral depends on the initial conditions and the integral can diverge under certain conditions.

== Decay of turbulence ==
For the viscosity dominated flows, during the decay of turbulence, the Kármán–Howarth equation reduces to a heat equation once the triple correlation tensor is neglected, i.e.,

$$\frac \partial {\partial t} (u'^2 f)  = \frac{2\nu u'^2}{r^4} \frac\partial {\partial r} \left(r^4 \frac{\partial f}{\partial r}\right).$$

With suitable boundary conditions, the solution to above equation is given by

$$f(r,t) =  e^{-r^2/8\nu t}, \quad u'^2 = \mathrm{const.}\times (\nu t)^{-5/2}$$

so that,

$$R_{ij}(r,t) \sim (\nu t)^{-5/2} e^{-r^2/8\nu t}.$$

== See also ==
- Kármán–Howarth–Monin equation (Andrei Monin's anisotropic generalization of the Kármán–Howarth relation)
- Batchelor–Chandrasekhar equation (homogeneous axisymmetric turbulence)
- Corrsin equation (Kármán–Howarth relation for scalar transport equation)
- Chandrasekhar invariant (density fluctuation invariant in isotropic homogeneous turbulence)
