= Keith Stewartson =

British mathematician (1925–1983)

- Born: 20 September 1925; Barnsley, Yorkshire, England
- Died: 7 May 1983 (aged 57); London, England
- Education: University of Cambridge
- Known for: Davey–Stewartson equation Complex Ginzburg–Landau equation Triple-deck theory Stewartson layer Stewartson–Illingworth transformation Roberts–Stewartson instability Hocking–Stewartson pulse
- Spouse: Jean Forrester
- Children: 3
- Scientific career
- Fields: Mathematics; Fluid Dynamics
- Workplaces: Bristol University; Caltech; University of Durham; University College London
- Thesis: (1949)
- Doctoral advisor: Leslie Howarth

Keith Stewartson (20 September 1925 – 7 May 1983) was an English mathematician and fellow of the Royal Society.

== Early life ==
The youngest of three children, Stewartson was born to an English baker in 1925. He was raised in Billingham, County Durham, where he attended Stockton Secondary School, and went to St Catharine's College, Cambridge in 1942. He won the Drury Prize in 1943 for his work in the Mathematical Tripos.

== Career ==
After graduation, with the Second World War still on-going, Stewartson began employment with the Ministry of Aircraft Production. During his time there he studied compressible fluid flow problems. After the war he returned to Cambridge and received the Mayhew Prize in 1946. He resumed research under the guidance of Leslie Howarth on boundary layer theory. His research led to his first publication, "Correlated incompressible and compressible boundary layers", which was published by the Royal Society in 1949. He received his doctorate the same year and became a lecturer at Bristol University in 1950. In 1953 he went to the United States to become a lecturer at the California Institute of Technology for a year before returning to Bristol University. In 1958 he was awarded a chair at the University of Durham. After finding Durham University too conservative, he moved to University College London in 1964. In his time there, he studied rotating fluid flows, shear layers, magnetohydrodynamics, triple-deck theory, and Reynolds number. He played major role in the founding of Institute of Mathematics and its Applications along with James Lighthill. In his career he authored 186 papers.

Natural convection boundary-layers along horizontal plate also known as the indirect convection was first explained by Stewartson in 1958.

=== Books ===
- Keith Stewartson (1964). The theory of laminar boundary layers in compressible fluids. Oxford University Press. ISBN 978-0198535041.

== Personal life ==
Stewartson was known as a passionate rower and enjoyed theatre and opera. In 1950, he married Jean Forrester; they had three children. In 1965, he became a member of the Royal Society. In 1974, he suffered a heart attack which he recovered from, before suffering a subsequent one in 1983 which hospitalized him. Two weeks later he had a third heart attack which proved fatal.
