= Jet noise =

Noise caused by jets

In aeroacoustics, jet noise is the field that focuses on the noise generation caused by high-velocity jets and the turbulent eddies generated by shearing flow. Such noise is known as broadband noise and extends well beyond the range of human hearing (100 kHz and higher). Jet noise is also responsible for some of the loudest sounds ever produced by mankind.

== Sources of jet noise ==
The primary sources of jet noise for a high-speed air jet (meaning when the exhaust velocity exceeds about 100 m/s; 360 km/h; 225 mph) are "jet mixing noise" and, for supersonic flow, shock associated noise. Acoustic sources within the "jet pipe" also contribute to the noise, mainly at lower speeds, which include combustion noise, and sounds produced by interactions of a turbulent stream with fans, compressors, and turbine systems.

The jet mixing sound is created by the turbulent mixing of a jet with the ambient fluid, in most cases, air. The mixing initially occurs in an annular shear layer, which grows with the length of the nozzle. The mixing region generally fills the entire jet at four or five diameters from the nozzle. The high-frequency components of the sound are mainly stationed close to the nozzle, where the dimensions of the turbulence eddies are small. Further down the jet, where the eddy size is similar to the jet diameter, is where lower frequency begins.

In supersonic or choked jets there are cells through which the flow continuously expands and contracts. Several of these "shock cells" can be seen extending up to ten jet diameters from the nozzle and are responsible for two additional components of jet noise, screech tones, and broadband shock associated noises. Screech is produced by a feedback mechanism in which a disturbance convecting in the shear layer generates sound as it traverses the standing system of shock waves in the jet. Even though screech is a side effect of the jet's flight, it can be suppressed by an appropriate design for a nozzle.

Aircraft noise is also sometimes called jet noise when emanating from jet aircraft, regardless of the mechanism of noise production.

== See also ==
- Aircraft noise pollution
- Lighthill's eighth power law
- QTOL
- Stealth aircraft
