= Leslie Howarth =

British mathematician

- Born: 23 May 1911; Bacup
- Died: 22 September 2001 (aged 90)
- Education: University of Manchester; University of Cambridge
- Known for: Kármán–Howarth equation; Howarth–Dorodnitsyn transformation
- Awards: Smith's Prize (1935); Fellow of the Royal Society (1950); Adams Prize (1951)
- Scientific career
- Fields: Mathematics; Fluid dynamics
- Institutions: King's College, Cambridge; University of Cambridge; Bristol University; Caltech
- Thesis: Problems of Fluid Flow (1936)
- Doctoral advisor: Sydney Goldstein
- Doctoral students: Keith Stewartson

Leslie Howarth, FRS (23 May 1911 – 22 September 2001) was a British mathematician who dealt with hydrodynamics and aerodynamics.

== Biography ==
Leslie Howarth was born in Bacup, Lancashire, England. He was educated at Accrington Grammar School, whence he moved to the University of Manchester and then on to Gonville and Caius College, Cambridge. At Cambridge, Howarth received a bachelor's degree in mathematics in 1933 and a doctorate under the supervision of Sydney Goldstein in 1936.

Howarth married Eva Priestley when he was still a research student. Afterwards, he was a lecturer at King's College, Cambridge. In 1937–38 he was with Theodore von Kármán at Caltech. During World War II he worked first in ballistics and from 1942 at the Armament Research Department.

After the war, he was a lecturer at St John's College, Cambridge, where Abdus Salam was one of his students, and from 1949 Professor of Applied Mathematics at the University of Bristol. In 1964 he became Henry Overton Wills Professor and Head of the Mathematics Faculty. From 1957 to 1960 he was dean of the Faculty of Science. In 1976 he became emeritus professor.

== Research ==
Haworth dealt especially with boundary layer theory. A work with Theodore von Kármán in 1938 was about isotropic turbulence.

== Honours ==
In 1935 Haworth received the Smith's Prize, and in 1951 the Adams Prize. In 1950 he became a Fellow of the Royal Society. In 1955 he was awarded the OBE.

== Family ==
In 1934 Howarth married Eva Priestley, with whom he had two sons.

== See also ==
- Keith Stewartson
- Sydney Goldstein
