= James Lighthill =

British applied mathematician (1924–1998)

Sir James Lighthill FRS FRAeS
- Michael James Lighthill
- Born: Michael James Lighthill; 23 January 1924; Paris, France
- Died: 17 July 1998 (aged 74); Sark, Channel Islands
- Citizenship: British
- Education: Winchester College
- Alma mater: University of Cambridge
- Known for: Lighthill report Lighthill's equation Lighthill's eighth power law Lighthill mechanism Aeroacoustics; Fluid dynamics
- Awards: Timoshenko Medal (1963); Royal Medal (1964); Elliott Cresson Medal (1975); Naylor Prize and Lectureship (1977); IMA Gold Medal (1982); Otto Laporte Award (1984); Rayleigh Medal (1992); Copley Medal (1998)
- Scientific career
- Fields: Mathematics, Acoustics
- Workplaces: University of Manchester; University College London; University of Cambridge; Imperial College London
- Doctoral advisor: Sydney Goldstein
- Doctoral students: Gerald B. Whitham
- Other notable students: Steve Furber

Sir Michael James Lighthill FRS FRAeS (23 January 1924 – 17 July 1998) was a British applied mathematician, known for his pioneering work in the field of aeroacoustics and for writing the Lighthill report in 1973, which pessimistically stated that "In no part of the field (of AI) have the discoveries made so far produced the major impact that was then promised", contributing to the gloomy climate of AI winter.

== Education and early life ==
James Lighthill was born to Ernest Balzar Lichtenberg and Marjorie Holmes: an Alsatian mining engineer who changed his name to Lighthill in 1917, and the daughter of an engineer. The family lived in Paris until 1927, when the father retired and returned to live in England. As a young man, James Lighthill was known as Michael Lighthill.

Lighthill was educated at Winchester College, and graduated with a Bachelor of Arts degree from the University of Cambridge where he was an undergraduate student of Trinity College, Cambridge in 1943.

== Career and research ==
Lighthill specialised in fluid dynamics, and worked at the National Physical Laboratory. Between 1946 and 1959 he was Beyer Professor of Applied Mathematics at the University of Manchester. Lighthill then moved from Manchester to become director of the Royal Aircraft Establishment at Farnborough. There he worked on the development of television and communications satellites, and on the development of crewed spacecraft. This latter work was used in the development of the Concorde supersonic airliner.

In 1955, together with Gerald B. Whitham, Lighthill set out the first comprehensive theory of kinematic waves (an application of the method of characteristics), with a multitude of applications, prime among them fluid flow and traffic flow.

Lighthill's early work included two-dimensional aerofoil theory, and supersonic flow around solids of revolution. In addition to the dynamics of gas at high speeds, he studied shock and blast waves and introduced the squirmer model. He is credited with founding the subject of aeroacoustics, a subject vital to the reduction of noise in jet engines. Lighthill's eighth power law states that the acoustic power radiated by a jet engine is proportional to the eighth power of the jet speed. He also founded non-linear acoustics, and showed that the same non-linear differential equations could model both flood waves in rivers and traffic flow in highways.

In 1964 he became the Royal Society's resident professor in Imperial College London, before returning to Trinity College, Cambridge, five years later as Lucasian Professor of Mathematics, a chair he held until 1979, when he was succeeded by Stephen Hawking. Lighthill then became Provost of University College London (UCL) – a post he held until 1989.

Lighthill founded the Institute of Mathematics and its Applications (IMA) in 1964, alongside Professor Sir Bryan Thwaites. In 1968, he was awarded an Honorary Degree (Doctor of Science) by the University of Bath. In 1972 he was invited to deliver the MacMillan Memorial Lecture to the Institution of Engineers and Shipbuilders in Scotland. He chose the subject "Aquatic Animal Locomotion".

In the early 1970s, partly in reaction to significant internal discord within that field, the Science Research Council (SRC), as it was then known, asked Lighthill to compile a review of academic research in Artificial Intelligence. Lighthill's report, which was published in 1973 and became known as the "Lighthill report", was highly critical of basic research in foundational areas such as robotics and language processing, and "formed the basis for the decision by the British government to end support for AI research in all but two universities", starting what is sometimes referred to as the "AI winter".

In 1982, Lighthill and Alan B. Tayler were jointly awarded the first ever Gold Medal of the Institute of Mathematics and its Applications in recognition of their "outstanding contributions to mathematics and its applications over a period of years". In 1983 Lighthill was awarded the Ludwig Prandtl Ring from the Deutsche Gesellschaft für Luft- und Raumfahrt (German Society for Aeronautics and Astronautics) for "outstanding contribution in the field of aerospace engineering".

His former students include Gerald B. Whitham and Steve Furber.

=== Publications ===
- Lighthill, M. J. (1952). "On sound generated aerodynamically. I. General theory". Proceedings of the Royal Society A. 211 (1107): 564–587. Bibcode:1952RSPSA.211..564L. doi:10.1098/rspa.1952.0060. S2CID 124316233.
- Lighthill, M. J. (1954). "On sound generated aerodynamically. II. Turbulence as a source of sound". Proceedings of the Royal Society A. 222 (1148): 1–32. Bibcode:1954RSPSA.222....1L. doi:10.1098/rspa.1954.0049. S2CID 123268161.
- Lighthill, M. J. (2003) [1st Pub. 1958]. Introduction to Fourier Analysis and Generalised Functions. Cambridge Monographs on Mechanics. Cambridge, UK: Cambridge University Press. ISBN 0521091284.
- Lighthill, M. J. (1960). Higher approximations in aerodynamics theory. Princeton University Press. OCLC 927443661.
- Lighthill, M. J. (1986). An informal introduction to theoretical fluid mechanics. Oxford: Clarendon Press. ISBN 978-0-19-853630-7.
- Lighthill, M. J. (1987). Mathematical Biofluiddynamics. CBMS-NSF Regional Conference Series in Applied Mathematics. Society for Industrial Mathematics. ISBN 978-0-89871-014-4.
- Lighthill, M. J. (2001). Waves in fluids. Cambridge, UK: Cambridge University Press. ISBN 978-0-521-01045-0.
- Lighthill, M. J. (1997). Hussaini, M. Yousuff (ed.). Collected papers of Sir James Lighthill. Oxford: Oxford University Press. ISBN 978-0-19-509222-6.

=== Awards and honours ===
Lighthill was elected FRS in 1953 and FRAS in 1961.

He was awarded the Royal Medal of the Royal Society in 1964, and the Copley Medal, also of the Royal Society, posthumously, in 1998.

In 1958, Lightill was elected to the American Academy of Arts and Sciences.

The James Lighthill building at the University of Manchester and James Lighthill House are named in his honour.

Lighthill was elected to the American Philosophical Society in 1970.

In 1971 Lighthill was made knight in the New Year's Honours.

In 1976, Lighthill was elected a Member of the National Academy of Sciences, one of at least nine such foreign academies to elect him, including the French and Russian.

In 1992, Lighthill was awarded the Rayleigh Medal by the Institute of Acoustics (United Kingdom).

Lighthill was also made an honorary member of many bodies, and received twenty-four honorary doctorates. He was invited to give, and delivered, many prize and plenary lectures.

== Personal life ==
His hobby was open-water swimming. He died in the water in 1998 when the mitral valve in his heart ruptured while he was swimming round the island of Sark, a feat which he had accomplished many times before.

== Collections ==
Lighthill's archive is held at University College London Special Collections; it was given by the Mathematics Department in 2008. The collection spans over 120 boxes and contains working papers, lecture notes, publications, correspondence and personal papers from Lighthill, primarily from the 1970s - 1990s.

Academic offices
Preceded by Sydney Goldstein	Beyer Chair of Applied Mathematics at University of Manchester; 1950–1959	Succeeded by Fritz Ursell
Preceded by Paul Dirac	Lucasian Professor of Mathematics at Cambridge University; 1969–1978	Succeeded by Stephen Hawking
Preceded by Noel Annan	Provost of University College London; 1979–1989	Succeeded by Derek Roberts
